The Roman Empire was the post-Republican period of ancient Rome. As a polity, it included large territorial holdings around the Mediterranean Sea in Europe, North Africa, and Western Asia, and was ruled by emperors. From the accession of Caesar Augustus as the first Roman emperor to the military anarchy of the 3rd century, it was a Principate with Italia as the metropole of its provinces and the city of Rome as its sole capital. The Empire was later ruled by multiple emperors who shared control over the Western Roman Empire and the Eastern Roman Empire. The city of Rome remained the nominal capital of both parts until AD 476 when the imperial insignia were sent to Constantinople following the capture of the Western capital of Ravenna by the Germanic barbarians. The adoption of Christianity as the state church of the Roman Empire in AD 380 and the fall of the Western Roman Empire to Germanic kings conventionally marks the end of classical antiquity and the beginning of the Middle Ages. Because of these events, along with the gradual Hellenization of the Eastern Roman Empire, historians distinguish the medieval Roman Empire that remained in the Eastern provinces as the Byzantine Empire.

The predecessor state of the Roman Empire, the Roman Republic, became severely destabilized in civil wars and political conflicts. In the middle of the 1st century BC, Julius Caesar was appointed as dictator perpetuo ("dictator in perpetuity"), and then assassinated in 44 BC. Civil wars and proscriptions continued, eventually culminating in the victory of Octavian over Mark Antony and Cleopatra at the Battle of Actium in 31 BC. The following year, Octavian conquered the Ptolemaic Kingdom in Egypt, ending the Hellenistic period that had begun with the 4th century BC conquests of Alexander the Great. Octavian's power became unassailable and the Roman Senate granted him overarching power and the new title of Augustus, making him the first Roman emperor. The vast Roman territories were organized in senatorial and imperial provinces except Italy, which continued to serve as a metropole.

The first two centuries of the Roman Empire saw a period of unprecedented stability and prosperity known as the Pax Romana. Rome reached its greatest territorial expanse during the reign of Trajan (AD 98–117); a period of increasing trouble and decline began with the reign of Commodus (177–192). In the 3rd century, the Empire underwent a crisis that threatened its existence, as the Gallic and Palmyrene Empires broke away from the Roman state, and a series of short-lived emperors, often from the legions, led the Empire. It was reunified under Aurelian. To stabilize it, Diocletian set up two different imperial courts in the Greek East and Latin West in 286; Christians rose to positions of power in the 4th century following the Edict of Milan of 313. Shortly after, the Migration Period, involving large invasions by Germanic peoples and by the Huns of Attila, led to the decline of the Western Roman Empire. With the fall of Ravenna to the Germanic Herulians and the deposition of Romulus Augustus in AD 476 by Odoacer, the Western Roman Empire finally collapsed; the Eastern Roman emperor Zeno formally abolished it in AD 480. The Eastern Roman Empire survived for another millennium, until Constantinople fell in 1453 to the Ottoman Turks under Mehmed II.

Due to the Roman Empire's vast extent and long endurance, the institutions and culture of Rome had a profound and lasting influence on the development of language, religion, art, architecture, literature, philosophy, law, and forms of government in the territory it governed. The Latin language of the Romans evolved into the Romance languages of the medieval and modern world, while Medieval Greek became the language of the Eastern Roman Empire. The Empire's adoption of Christianity led to the formation of medieval Christendom. Roman and Greek art had a profound impact on the Italian Renaissance. Rome's architectural tradition served as the basis for Romanesque, Renaissance and Neoclassical architecture, and also had a strong influence on Islamic architecture. The rediscovery of Greek and Roman science and technology (which also formed the basis for Islamic science) in Medieval Europe led to the Scientific Renaissance and Scientific Revolution. The corpus of Roman law has its descendants in many modern legal systems of the world, such as the Napoleonic Code of France, while Rome's republican institutions have left an enduring legacy, influencing the Italian city-state republics of the medieval period, as well as the early United States and other modern democratic republics.

History

Transition from Republic to Empire

Rome had begun expanding shortly after the founding of the Roman Republic in the 6th century BC, though it did not expand outside the Italian peninsula until the 3rd century BC. Then, it was an "empire" (i.e., a great power) long before it had an emperor. The Republic was not a nation-state in the modern sense, but a network of towns left to rule themselves (though with varying degrees of independence from the Roman Senate) and provinces administered by military commanders. It was ruled, not by emperors, but by annually elected magistrates (Roman consuls above all) in conjunction with the Senate. For various reasons, the 1st century BC was a time of political and military upheaval, which ultimately led to rule by emperors. The consuls' military power rested in the Roman legal concept of imperium, which literally means "command" (though typically in a military sense). Occasionally, successful consuls were given the honorary title imperator (commander), and this is the origin of the word emperor (and empire) since this title (among others) was always bestowed to the early emperors upon their accession.

Rome suffered a long series of internal conflicts, conspiracies, and civil wars from the late second century BC onward, while greatly extending its power beyond Italy. This was the period of the Crisis of the Roman Republic. Towards the end of this era, in 44 BC, Julius Caesar was briefly perpetual dictator before being assassinated. The faction of his assassins was driven from Rome and defeated at the Battle of Philippi in 42 BC by an army led by Mark Antony and Caesar's adopted son Octavian. Antony and Octavian's division of the Roman world between themselves did not last and Octavian's forces defeated those of Mark Antony and Cleopatra at the Battle of Actium in 31 BC. In 27 BC the Senate and People of Rome made Octavian princeps ("first citizen") with proconsular imperium, thus beginning the Principate (the first epoch of Roman imperial history, usually dated from 27 BC to 284 AD), and gave him the title Augustus ("the venerated"). Though the old constitutional machinery remained in place, Augustus came to predominate it. Although the republic stood in name, contemporaries of Augustus knew it was just a veil and that Augustus had all meaningful authority in Rome. Since his rule ended a century of civil wars and began an unprecedented period of peace and prosperity, he was so loved that he came to hold the power of a monarch de facto if not de jure. During the years of his rule, a new constitutional order emerged (in part organically and in part by design), so that, upon his death, this new constitutional order operated as before when Tiberius was accepted as the new emperor.

In 117 AD, under the rule of Trajan, the Roman Empire, at its farthest extent, dominated much of the Mediterranean Basin, spanning three continents.

The Pax Romana

The 200 years that began with Augustus's rule is traditionally regarded as the Pax Romana ("Roman Peace"). During this period, the cohesion of the empire was furthered by a degree of social stability and economic prosperity that Rome had never before experienced. Uprisings in the provinces were infrequent but put down "mercilessly and swiftly" when they occurred. The success of Augustus in establishing principles of dynastic succession was limited by his outliving a number of talented potential heirs. The Julio-Claudian dynasty lasted for four more emperors—Tiberius, Caligula, Claudius, and Nero—before it yielded in 69 AD to the strife-torn Year of the Four Emperors, from which Vespasian emerged as victor. Vespasian became the founder of the brief Flavian dynasty, to be followed by the Nerva–Antonine dynasty which produced the "Five Good Emperors": Nerva, Trajan, Hadrian, Antoninus Pius, and the philosophically-inclined Marcus Aurelius.

Fall in the West and survival in the East

In the view of the Greek historian Dio Cassius, a contemporary observer, the accession of the emperor Commodus in 180 AD marked the descent "from a kingdom of gold to one of rust and iron"—a famous comment which has led some historians, notably Edward Gibbon, to take Commodus' reign as the beginning of the decline of the Roman Empire.

In 212 AD, during the reign of Caracalla, Roman citizenship was granted to all freeborn inhabitants of the empire. But despite this gesture of universality, the Severan dynasty was tumultuous—an emperor's reign was ended routinely by his murder or execution—and, following its collapse, the Roman Empire was engulfed by the Crisis of the Third Century, a period of invasions, civil strife, economic disorder, and plague.

In defining historical epochs, this crisis is sometimes viewed as marking the transition from Classical Antiquity to Late Antiquity. Aurelian brought the empire back from the brink and stabilized it. Diocletian completed the work of fully restoring the empire, but declined the role of princeps and became the first emperor to be addressed regularly as domine ("master" or "lord"). Diocletian's reign also brought the empire's most concerted effort against the perceived threat of Christianity, the "Great Persecution".

Diocletian divided the empire into four regions, each ruled by a separate emperor, the Tetrarchy. Confident that he fixed the disorders that were plaguing Rome, he abdicated along with his co-emperor, and the Tetrarchy soon collapsed. Order was eventually restored by Constantine the Great, who became the first emperor to convert to Christianity, and who established Constantinople as the new capital of the Eastern Empire. During the decades of the Constantinian and Valentinian dynasties, the empire was divided along an east–west axis, with dual power centres in Constantinople and Rome. The reign of Julian, who under the influence of his adviser Mardonius attempted to restore Classical Roman and Hellenistic religion, only briefly interrupted the succession of Christian emperors. Theodosius I, the last emperor to rule over both East and West, died in 395 AD after making Christianity the official religion of the empire.

The Western Roman Empire began to disintegrate in the early 5th century as Germanic migrations and invasions overwhelmed the capacity of the empire to assimilate the migrants and fight off the invaders. The Romans were successful in fighting off all invaders, most famously Attila, although the empire had assimilated so many Germanic peoples of dubious loyalty to Rome that the empire started to dismember itself. Most chronologies place the end of the Western Roman Empire in 476, when Romulus Augustulus was forced to abdicate to the Germanic warlord Odoacer.

By placing himself under the rule of the Eastern Emperor, rather than naming a puppet emperor of his own, Odoacer ended the Western Empire. He did this by declaring Zeno sole emperor, and placing himself as his nominal subordinate. In reality, Italy was now ruled by Odoacer alone. The Eastern Roman Empire, also called the Byzantine Empire by later historians, continued to exist until the reign of Constantine XI Palaiologos. The last Roman emperor died in battle on 29 May 1453 against Mehmed II "the Conqueror" and his Ottoman forces in the final stages of the siege of Constantinople. Mehmed II would himself also claim the title of caesar or Kayser-i Rum in an attempt to claim a connection to the Roman Empire.

Geography and demography

The Roman Empire was one of the largest in history, with contiguous territories throughout Europe, North Africa, and the Middle East. The Latin phrase imperium sine fine ("empire without end") expressed the ideology that neither time nor space limited the Empire. In Virgil's epic poem the Aeneid, limitless empire is said to be granted to the Romans by their supreme deity Jupiter. This claim of universal dominion was renewed and perpetuated when the Empire came under Christian rule in the 4th century. In addition to annexing large regions in their quest for empire-building, the Romans were also very large sculptors of their environment who directly altered their geography. For instance, entire forests were cut down to provide enough wood resources for an expanding empire.

In reality, Roman expansion was mostly accomplished under the Republic, though parts of northern Europe were conquered in the 1st century AD, when Roman control in Europe, Africa, and Asia was strengthened. During the reign of Augustus, a "global map of the known world" was displayed for the first time in public at Rome, coinciding with the composition of the most comprehensive work on political geography that survives from antiquity, the Geography of the Pontic Greek writer Strabo. When Augustus died, the commemorative account of his achievements (Res Gestae) prominently featured the geographical cataloguing of peoples and places within the Empire. Geography, the census, and the meticulous keeping of written records were central concerns of Roman Imperial administration.

The Empire reached its largest expanse under Trajan, encompassing an area of 5 million square kilometres. The traditional population estimate of  inhabitants accounted for between one-sixth and one-fourth of the world's total population and made it the largest population of any unified political entity in the West until the mid-19th century. Each of the three largest cities in the Empire – Rome, Alexandria, and Antioch – was almost twice the size of any European city at the beginning of the 17th century.

As the historian Christopher Kelly has described it:

Trajan's successor Hadrian adopted a policy of maintaining rather than expanding the empire. Borders (fines) were marked, and the frontiers (limites) patrolled. The most heavily fortified borders were the most unstable. Hadrian's Wall, which separated the Roman world from what was perceived as an ever-present barbarian threat, is the primary surviving monument of this effort.

Languages

The language of the Romans was Latin, which Virgil emphasized as a source of Roman unity and tradition. Until the time of Alexander Severus, the birth certificates and wills of Roman citizens had to be written in Latin. Latin was the language of the law courts in the West and of the military throughout the Empire, but was not imposed officially on peoples brought under Roman rule. This policy contrasts with that of Alexander the Great, who aimed to impose Greek throughout his empire as the official language. As a consequence of Alexander's conquests, Koine Greek had become the shared language around the eastern Mediterranean and into Asia Minor. The "linguistic frontier" dividing the Latin West and the Greek East passed through the Balkan peninsula.

Romans who received an elite education studied Greek as a literary language, and most men of the governing classes could speak Greek. The Julio-Claudian emperors encouraged high standards of correct Latin (Latinitas), a linguistic movement identified in modern terms as Classical Latin, and favoured Latin for conducting official business. Claudius tried to limit the use of Greek, and on occasion revoked the citizenship of those who lacked Latin, but even in the Senate he drew on his own bilingualism in communicating with Greek-speaking ambassadors. Suetonius quotes him as referring to "our two languages".

In the Eastern empire, laws and official documents were regularly translated into Greek from Latin. The everyday interpenetration of the two languages is indicated by bilingual inscriptions, which sometimes even switch back and forth between Greek and Latin. After all freeborn inhabitants of the empire were universally enfranchised in 212 AD, a great number of Roman citizens would have lacked Latin, though Latin remained a marker of "Romanness."

Among other reforms, the emperor Diocletian sought to renew the authority of Latin, and the Greek expression hē kratousa dialektos attests to the continuing status of Latin as "the language of power." In the early 6th century, the emperor Justinian engaged in a quixotic effort to reassert the status of Latin as the language of law, even though in his time Latin no longer held any currency as a living language in the East.

Local languages and linguistic legacy

References to interpreters indicate the continuing use of local languages other than Greek and Latin, particularly in Egypt, where Coptic predominated, and in military settings along the Rhine and Danube. Roman jurists also show a concern for local languages such as Punic, Gaulish, and Aramaic in assuring the correct understanding and application of laws and oaths. In the province of Africa, Libyco-Berber and Punic were used in inscriptions and for legends on coins during the time of Tiberius (1st century AD). Libyco-Berber and Punic inscriptions appear on public buildings into the 2nd century, some bilingual with Latin. In Syria, Palmyrene soldiers even used their dialect of Aramaic for inscriptions, in a striking exception to the rule that Latin was the language of the military.

The Babatha Archive is a suggestive example of multilingualism in the Empire. These papyri, named for a Jewish woman in the province of Arabia and dating from 93 to 132 AD, mostly employ Aramaic, the local language, written in Greek characters with Semitic and Latin influences; a petition to the Roman governor, however, was written in Greek.

The dominance of Latin among the literate elite may obscure the continuity of spoken languages, since all cultures within the Roman Empire were predominantly oral. In the West, Latin, referred to in its spoken form as Vulgar Latin, gradually replaced Celtic and Italic languages that were related to it by a shared Indo-European origin. Commonalities in syntax and vocabulary facilitated the adoption of Latin.

After the decentralization of political power in late antiquity, Latin developed locally into branches that became the Romance languages, such as Spanish, Portuguese, French, Italian, Catalan and Romanian, and a large number of minor languages and dialects. Today, more than 900 million people are native speakers worldwide. As an international language of learning and literature, Latin itself continued as an active medium of expression for diplomacy and for intellectual developments identified with Renaissance humanism up to the 17th century, and for law and the Roman Catholic Church to the present.

Although Greek continued as the language of the Byzantine Empire, linguistic distribution in the East was more complex. A Greek-speaking majority lived in the Greek peninsula and islands, western Anatolia, major cities, and some coastal areas. Like Greek and Latin, the Thracian language was of Indo-European origin, as were several now-extinct languages in Anatolia attested by Imperial-era inscriptions. Albanian is often seen as the descendant of Illyrian, although this hypothesis has been challenged by some linguists, who maintain that it derives from Dacian or Thracian. (Illyrian, Dacian, and Thracian, however, may have formed a subgroup or a Sprachbund; see Thraco-Illyrian.) Various Afroasiatic languages—primarily Coptic in Egypt, and Aramaic in Syria and Mesopotamia—were never replaced by Greek. The international use of Greek, however, was one factor enabling the spread of Christianity, as indicated for example by the use of Greek for the Epistles of Paul.

Several references to Gaulish in late antiquity may indicate that it continued to be spoken. In the second century AD there was an explicit recognition of its usage in some legal manners, soothsaying and pharmacology. Sulpicius Severus, writing in the 5th century AD in Gallia Aquitania, noted bilingualism with Gaulish as the first language. The survival of the Galatian dialect in Anatolia akin to that spoken by the Treveri near Trier was attested by Jerome (331–420), who had first-hand knowledge. Much of historical linguistics scholarship postulates that Gaulish was indeed still spoken as late as the mid to late 6th century in France. Despite considerable Romanization of the local material culture, the Gaulish language is held to have survived and had coexisted with spoken Latin during the centuries of Roman rule of Gaul. The last reference to Galatian was made by Cyril of Scythopolis, claiming that an evil spirit had possessed a monk and rendered him able to speak only in Galatian, while the last reference to Gaulish in France was made by Gregory of Tours between 560 and 575, noting that a shrine in Auvergne which "is called Vasso Galatae in the Gallic tongue" was destroyed and burnt to the ground. After the long period of bilingualism, the emergent Gallo-Romance languages including French were shaped by Gaulish in a number of ways; in the case of French these include loanwords and calques (including oui, the word for "yes"), sound changes, and influences in conjugation and word order.

Proto-Basque language or Aquitanian survived the Roman conquest, and evolved with Latin loans to present day Basque language. Recent discoveries as the hand of Irulegi shows that this language was also written during the Roman conquest, but only proper names are known from the Roman Empire times.

Society

The Roman Empire was remarkably multicultural, with "a rather astonishing cohesive capacity" to create a sense of shared identity while encompassing diverse peoples within its political system over a long span of time. The Roman attention to creating public monuments and communal spaces open to all—such as forums, amphitheatres, racetracks and baths—helped foster a sense of "Romanness".

Roman society had multiple, overlapping social hierarchies that modern concepts of "class" in English may not represent accurately. The two decades of civil war from which Augustus rose to sole power left traditional society in Rome in a state of confusion and upheaval, but did not effect an immediate redistribution of wealth and social power. From the perspective of the lower classes, a peak was merely added to the social pyramid. Personal relationships—patronage, friendship (amicitia), family, marriage—continued to influence the workings of politics and government, as they had in the Republic. By the time of Nero, however, it was not unusual to find a former slave who was richer than a freeborn citizen, or an equestrian who exercised greater power than a senator.

The blurring or diffusion of the Republic's more rigid hierarchies led to increased social mobility under the Empire, both upward and downward, to an extent that exceeded that of all other well-documented ancient societies. Women, freedmen, and slaves had opportunities to profit and exercise influence in ways previously less available to them. Social life in the Empire, particularly for those whose personal resources were limited, was further fostered by a proliferation of voluntary associations and confraternities (collegia and sodalitates) formed for various purposes: professional and trade guilds, veterans' groups, religious sodalities, drinking and dining clubs, performing arts troupes, and burial societies.

Legal status

According to the jurist Gaius, the essential distinction in the Roman "law of persons" was that all human beings were either free (liberi) or slaves (servi). The legal status of free persons might be further defined by their citizenship. Most citizens held limited rights (such as the ius Latinum, "Latin right"), but were entitled to legal protections and privileges not enjoyed by those who lacked citizenship. Free people not considered citizens, but living within the Roman world, held status as peregrini, non-Romans. In 212 AD, by means of the edict known as the Constitutio Antoniniana, the emperor Caracalla extended citizenship to all freeborn inhabitants of the empire. This legal egalitarianism would have required a far-reaching revision of existing laws that had distinguished between citizens and non-citizens.

Women in Roman law

Freeborn Roman women were considered citizens throughout the Republic and Empire, but did not vote, hold political office, or serve in the military. A mother's citizen status determined that of her children, as indicated by the phrase ex duobus civibus Romanis natos ("children born of two Roman citizens"). A Roman woman kept her own family name (nomen) for life. Children most often took the father's name, but in the Imperial period sometimes made their mother's name part of theirs, or even used it instead.

The archaic form of manus marriage in which the woman had been subject to her husband's authority was largely abandoned by the Imperial era, and a married woman retained ownership of any property she brought into the marriage. Technically she remained under her father's legal authority, even though she moved into her husband's home, but when her father died she became legally emancipated. This arrangement was one of the factors in the degree of independence Roman women enjoyed relative to those of many other ancient cultures and up to the modern period: although she had to answer to her father in legal matters, she was free of his direct scrutiny in her daily life, and her husband had no legal power over her. Although it was a point of pride to be a "one-man woman" (univira) who had married only once, there was little stigma attached to divorce, nor to speedy remarriage after the loss of a husband through death or divorce.

Girls had equal inheritance rights with boys if their father died without leaving a will. A Roman mother's right to own property and to dispose of it as she saw fit, including setting the terms of her own will, gave her enormous influence over her sons even when they were adults.

As part of the Augustan programme to restore traditional morality and social order, moral legislation attempted to regulate the conduct of men and women as a means of promoting "family values". Adultery, which had been a private family matter under the Republic, was criminalized, and defined broadly as an illicit sex act (stuprum) that occurred between a male citizen and a married woman, or between a married woman and any man other than her husband. That is, a double standard was in place: a married woman could have sex only with her husband, but a married man did not commit adultery if he had sex with a prostitute, slave, or person of marginalized status. Childbearing was encouraged by the state: a woman who had given birth to three children was granted symbolic honours and greater legal freedom (the ius trium liberorum).

Because of their legal status as citizens and the degree to which they could become emancipated, women could own property, enter contracts, and engage in business, including shipping, manufacturing, and lending money. Inscriptions throughout the Empire honour women as benefactors in funding public works, an indication they could acquire and dispose of considerable fortunes; for instance, the Arch of the Sergii was funded by Salvia Postuma, a female member of the family honoured, and the largest building in the forum at Pompeii was funded by Eumachia, a priestess of Venus.

Slaves and the law

At the time of Augustus, as many as 35% of the people in Italy were slaves, making Rome one of five historical "slave societies" in which slaves constituted at least a fifth of the population and played a major role in the economy. Slavery was a complex institution that supported traditional Roman social structures as well as contributing economic utility. In urban settings, slaves might be professionals such as teachers, physicians, chefs, and accountants, in addition to the majority of slaves who provided trained or unskilled labour in households or workplaces. Agriculture and industry, such as milling and mining, relied on the exploitation of slaves. Outside Italy, slaves made up on average an estimated 10 to 20% of the population, sparse in Roman Egypt but more concentrated in some Greek areas. Expanding Roman ownership of arable land and industries would have affected preexisting practices of slavery in the provinces.

Although the institution of slavery has often been regarded as waning in the 3rd and 4th centuries, it remained an integral part of Roman society until the 5th century. Slavery ceased gradually in the 6th and 7th centuries along with the decline of urban centres in the West and the disintegration of the complex Imperial economy that had created the demand for it.

Laws pertaining to slavery were "extremely intricate". Under Roman law, slaves were considered property and had no legal personhood. They could be subjected to forms of corporal punishment not normally exercised on citizens, sexual exploitation, torture, and summary execution. A slave could not as a matter of law be raped since rape could be committed only against people who were free; a slave's rapist had to be prosecuted by the owner for property damage under the Aquilian Law. Slaves had no right to the form of legal marriage called conubium, but their unions were sometimes recognized, and if both were freed they could marry.

Following the Servile Wars of the Republic, legislation under Augustus and his successors shows a driving concern for controlling the threat of rebellions through limiting the size of work groups, and for hunting down fugitive slaves.

Technically, a slave could not own property, but a slave who conducted business might be given access to an individual account or fund (peculium) that he could use as if it were his own. The terms of this account varied depending on the degree of trust and co-operation between owner and slave: a slave with an aptitude for business could be given considerable leeway to generate profit and might be allowed to bequeath the peculium he managed to other slaves of his household. Within a household or workplace, a hierarchy of slaves might exist, with one slave in effect acting as the master of other slaves.

Over time slaves gained increased legal protection, including the right to file complaints against their masters. A bill of sale might contain a clause stipulating that the slave could not be employed for prostitution, as prostitutes in ancient Rome were often slaves. The burgeoning trade in eunuch slaves in the late 1st century AD prompted legislation that prohibited the castration of a slave against his will "for lust or gain."

Roman slavery was not based on race. Slaves were drawn from all over Europe and the Mediterranean, including Gaul, Hispania, Germany, Britannia, the Balkans, Greece... Generally, slaves in Italy were indigenous Italians, with a minority of foreigners (including both slaves and freedmen) born outside of Italy estimated at 5% of the total in the capital at its peak, where their number was largest. Those from outside of Europe were predominantly of Greek descent, while the Jewish ones never fully assimilated into Roman society, remaining an identifiable minority. These slaves (especially the foreigners) had higher mortality rates and lower birth rates than natives, and were sometimes even subjected to mass expulsions. The average recorded age at death for the slaves of the city of Rome was extraordinarily low: seventeen and a half years (17.2 for males; 17.9 for females).

During the period of republican expansionism when slavery had become pervasive, war captives were a main source of slaves. The range of ethnicities among slaves to some extent reflected that of the armies Rome defeated in war, and the conquest of Greece brought a number of highly skilled and educated slaves into Rome. Slaves were also traded in markets and sometimes sold by pirates. Infant abandonment and self-enslavement among the poor were other sources. Vernae, by contrast, were "homegrown" slaves born to female slaves within the urban household or on a country estate or farm. Although they had no special legal status, an owner who mistreated or failed to care for his vernae faced social disapproval, as they were considered part of his familia, the family household, and in some cases might actually be the children of free males in the family.

Talented slaves with a knack for business might accumulate a large enough peculium to justify their freedom, or be manumitted for services rendered. Manumission had become frequent enough that in 2 BC a law (Lex Fufia Caninia) limited the number of slaves an owner was allowed to free in his will.

Freedmen

Rome differed from Greek city-states in allowing freed slaves to become citizens. After manumission, a slave who had belonged to a Roman citizen enjoyed not only passive freedom from ownership, but active political freedom (libertas), including the right to vote. A slave who had acquired libertas was a libertus ("freed person," feminine liberta) in relation to his former master, who then became his patron (patronus): the two parties continued to have customary and legal obligations to each other. As a social class generally, freed slaves were libertini, though later writers used the terms libertus and libertinus interchangeably.

A libertinus was not entitled to hold public office or the highest state priesthoods, but he could play a priestly role in the cult of the emperor. He could not marry a woman from a family of senatorial rank, nor achieve legitimate senatorial rank himself, but during the early Empire, freedmen held key positions in the government bureaucracy, so much so that Hadrian limited their participation by law. Any future children of a freedman would be born free, with full rights of citizenship.

The rise of successful freedmen—through either political influence in imperial service or wealth—is a characteristic of early Imperial society. The prosperity of a high-achieving group of freedmen is attested by inscriptions throughout the Empire, and by their ownership of some of the most lavish houses at Pompeii, such as the House of the Vettii. The excesses of nouveau riche freedmen were satirized in the character of Trimalchio in the Satyricon by Petronius, who wrote in the time of Nero. Such individuals, while exceptional, are indicative of the upward social mobility possible in the Empire.

Census rank

The Latin word ordo (plural ordines) refers to a social distinction that is translated variously into English as "class, order, rank," none of which is exact. One purpose of the Roman census was to determine the ordo to which an individual belonged. The two highest ordines in Rome were the senatorial and equestrian. Outside Rome, the decurions, also known as curiales (Greek bouleutai), were the top governing ordo of an individual city.

"Senator" was not itself an elected office in ancient Rome; an individual gained admission to the Senate after he had been elected to and served at least one term as an executive magistrate. A senator also had to meet a minimum property requirement of 1 million sestertii, as determined by the census. Nero made large gifts of money to a number of senators from old families who had become too impoverished to qualify. Not all men who qualified for the ordo senatorius chose to take a Senate seat, which required legal domicile at Rome. Emperors often filled vacancies in the 600-member body by appointment. A senator's son belonged to the ordo senatorius, but he had to qualify on his own merits for admission to the Senate itself. A senator could be removed for violating moral standards: he was prohibited, for instance, from marrying a freedwoman or fighting in the arena.

In the time of Nero, senators were still primarily from Rome and other parts of Italy, with some from the Iberian peninsula and southern France; men from the Greek-speaking provinces of the East began to be added under Vespasian. The first senator from the most eastern province, Cappadocia, was admitted under Marcus Aurelius. By the time of the Severan dynasty (193–235), Italians made up less than half the Senate. During the 3rd century, domicile at Rome became impractical, and inscriptions attest to senators who were active in politics and munificence in their homeland (patria).

Senators had an aura of prestige and were the traditional governing class who rose through the cursus honorum, the political career track, but equestrians of the Empire often possessed greater wealth and political power. Membership in the equestrian order was based on property; in Rome's early days, equites or knights had been distinguished by their ability to serve as mounted warriors (the "public horse"), but cavalry service was a separate function in the Empire. A census valuation of 400,000 sesterces and three generations of free birth qualified a man as an equestrian. The census of 28 BC uncovered large numbers of men who qualified, and in 14 AD, a thousand equestrians were registered at Cadiz and Padua alone. Equestrians rose through a military career track (tres militiae) to become highly placed prefects and procurators within the Imperial administration.

The rise of provincial men to the senatorial and equestrian orders is an aspect of social mobility in the first three centuries of the Empire. Roman aristocracy was based on competition, and unlike later European nobility, a Roman family could not maintain its position merely through hereditary succession or having title to lands. Admission to the higher ordines brought distinction and privileges, but also a number of responsibilities. In antiquity, a city depended on its leading citizens to fund public works, events, and services (munera), rather than on tax revenues, which primarily supported the military. Maintaining one's rank required massive personal expenditures. Decurions were so vital for the functioning of cities that in the later Empire, as the ranks of the town councils became depleted, those who had risen to the Senate were encouraged by the central government to give up their seats and return to their hometowns, in an effort to sustain civic life.

In the later Empire, the dignitas ("worth, esteem") that attended on senatorial or equestrian rank was refined further with titles such as vir illustris ("illustrious man"). The appellation clarissimus (Greek lamprotatos) was used to designate the dignitas of certain senators and their immediate family, including women. "Grades" of equestrian status proliferated. Those in Imperial service were ranked by pay grade (sexagenarius, 60,000 sesterces per annum; centenarius, 100,000; ducenarius, 200,000). The title eminentissimus, "most eminent" (Greek exochôtatos) was reserved for equestrians who had been Praetorian prefects. The higher equestrian officials in general were perfectissimi, "most distinguished" (Greek diasêmotatoi), the lower merely egregii, "outstanding" (Greek kratistos).

Unequal justice

As the republican principle of citizens' equality under the law faded, the symbolic and social privileges of the upper classes led to an informal division of Roman society into those who had acquired greater honours (honestiores) and those who were humbler folk (humiliores). In general, honestiores were the members of the three higher "orders," along with certain military officers. The granting of universal citizenship in 212 seems to have increased the competitive urge among the upper classes to have their superiority over other citizens affirmed, particularly within the justice system. Sentencing depended on the judgment of the presiding official as to the relative "worth" (dignitas) of the defendant: an honestior could pay a fine when convicted of a crime for which an humilior might receive a scourging.

Execution, which had been an infrequent legal penalty for free men under the Republic even in a capital case, could be quick and relatively painless for the Imperial citizen considered "more honourable", while those deemed inferior might suffer the kinds of torture and prolonged death previously reserved for slaves, such as crucifixion and condemnation to the beasts as a spectacle in the arena. In the early Empire, those who converted to Christianity could lose their standing as honestiores, especially if they declined to fulfil the religious aspects of their civic responsibilities, and thus became subject to punishments that created the conditions of martyrdom.

Government and military

The three major elements of the Imperial Roman state were the central government, the military, and the provincial government. The military established control of a territory through war, but after a city or people was brought under treaty, the military mission turned to policing: protecting Roman citizens (after 212 AD, all freeborn inhabitants of the Empire), the agricultural fields that fed them, and religious sites. Without modern instruments of either mass communication or mass destruction, the Romans lacked sufficient manpower or resources to impose their rule through force alone. Cooperation with local power elites was necessary to maintain order, collect information, and extract revenue. The Romans often exploited internal political divisions by supporting one faction over another: in the view of Plutarch, "it was discord between factions within cities that led to the loss of self-governance".

Communities with demonstrated loyalty to Rome retained their own laws, could collect their own taxes locally, and in exceptional cases were exempt from Roman taxation. Legal privileges and relative independence were an incentive to remain in good standing with Rome. Roman government was thus limited, but efficient in its use of the resources available to it.

Central government

The Imperial cult of ancient Rome identified emperors and some members of their families with the divinely sanctioned authority (auctoritas) of the Roman State. The rite of apotheosis (also called consecratio) signified the deceased emperor's deification and acknowledged his role as father of the people similar to the concept of a pater familias soul or Manes being honoured by his sons.

The dominance of the emperor was based on the consolidation of certain powers from several republican offices, including the inviolability of the tribunes of the people and the authority of the censors to manipulate the hierarchy of Roman society. The emperor also made himself the central religious authority as pontifex maximus, and centralized the right to declare war, ratify treaties, and negotiate with foreign leaders. While these functions were clearly defined during the Principate, the emperor's powers over time became less constitutional and more monarchical, culminating in the Dominate.

The emperor was the ultimate authority in policy- and decision-making, but in the early Principate, he was expected to be accessible to individuals from all walks of life and to deal personally with official business and petitions. A bureaucracy formed around him only gradually. The Julio-Claudian emperors relied on an informal body of advisors that included not only senators and equestrians, but trusted slaves and freedmen. After Nero, the unofficial influence of the latter was regarded with suspicion, and the emperor's council (consilium) became subject to official appointment for the sake of greater transparency. Though the Senate took a lead in policy discussions until the end of the Antonine dynasty, equestrians played an increasingly important role in the consilium. The women of the emperor's family often intervened directly in his decisions. Plotina exercised influence on both her husband Trajan and his successor Hadrian. Her influence was advertised by having her letters on official matters published, as a sign that the emperor was reasonable in his exercise of authority and listened to his people.

Access to the emperor by others might be gained at the daily reception (salutatio), a development of the traditional homage a client paid to his patron; public banquets hosted at the palace; and religious ceremonies. The common people who lacked this access could manifest their general approval or displeasure as a group at the games held in large venues. By the 4th century, as urban centres decayed, the Christian emperors became remote figureheads who issued general rulings, no longer responding to individual petitions.

Although the Senate could do little short of assassination and open rebellion to contravene the will of the emperor, it survived the Augustan restoration and the turbulent Year of the Four Emperors to retain its symbolic political centrality during the Principate. The Senate legitimated the emperor's rule, and the emperor needed the experience of senators as legates (legati) to serve as generals, diplomats, and administrators. A successful career required competence as an administrator and remaining in favour with the emperor, or over time perhaps multiple emperors.

The practical source of an emperor's power and authority was the military. The legionaries were paid by the Imperial treasury, and swore an annual military oath of loyalty to the emperor (sacramentum). The death of an emperor led to a crucial period of uncertainty and crisis. Most emperors indicated their choice of successor, usually a close family member or adopted heir. The new emperor had to seek a swift acknowledgement of his status and authority to stabilize the political landscape. No emperor could hope to survive, much less to reign, without the allegiance and loyalty of the Praetorian Guard and of the legions. To secure their loyalty, several emperors paid the donativum, a monetary reward. In theory, the Senate was entitled to choose the new emperor, but did so mindful of acclamation by the army or Praetorians.

Military

After the Punic Wars, the Imperial Roman army was composed of professional soldiers who volunteered for 20 years of active duty and five as reserves. The transition to a professional military had begun during the late Republic and was one of the many profound shifts away from republicanism, under which an army of conscripts had exercised their responsibilities as citizens in defending the homeland in a campaign against a specific threat. For Imperial Rome, the military was a full-time career in itself. The Romans expanded their war machine by "organizing the communities that they conquered in Italy into a system that generated huge reservoirs of manpower for their army... Their main demand of all defeated enemies was they provide men for the Roman army every year."

The primary mission of the Roman military of the early empire was to preserve the Pax Romana. The three major divisions of the military were:
 the garrison at Rome, which includes the Praetorian Guard, the cohortes urbanae and the vigiles, who functioned as police and firefighters;
 the provincial army, comprising the Roman legions and the auxiliaries provided by the provinces (auxilia);
 the navy.

The pervasiveness of military garrisons throughout the Empire was a major influence in the process of cultural exchange and assimilation known as "Romanization," particularly in regard to politics, the economy, and religion. Knowledge of the Roman military comes from a wide range of sources: Greek and Roman literary texts; coins with military themes; papyri preserving military documents; monuments such as Trajan's Column and triumphal arches, which feature artistic depictions of both fighting men and military machines; the archeology of military burials, battle sites, and camps; and inscriptions, including military diplomas, epitaphs, and dedications.

Through his military reforms, which included consolidating or disbanding units of questionable loyalty, Augustus changed and regularized the legion, down to the hobnail pattern on the soles of army boots. A legion was organized into ten cohorts, each of which comprised six centuries, with a century further made up of ten squads (contubernia); the exact size of the Imperial legion, which is most likely to have been determined by logistics, has been estimated to range from 4,800 to 5,280.

In 9 AD, Germanic tribes wiped out three full legions in the Battle of the Teutoburg Forest. This disastrous event reduced the number of legions to 25. The total of the legions would later be increased again and for the next 300 years always be a little above or below 30. The army had about 300,000 soldiers in the 1st century, and under 400,000 in the 2nd, "significantly smaller" than the collective armed forces of the territories it conquered. No more than 2% of adult males living in the Empire served in the Imperial army.

Augustus also created the Praetorian Guard: nine cohorts, ostensibly to maintain the public peace, which were garrisoned in Italy. Better paid than the legionaries, the Praetorians served only sixteen years.

The auxilia were recruited from among the non-citizens. Organized in smaller units of roughly cohort strength, they were paid less than the legionaries, and after 25 years of service were rewarded with Roman citizenship, also extended to their sons. According to Tacitus there were roughly as many auxiliaries as there were legionaries. The auxilia thus amounted to around 125,000 men, implying approximately 250 auxiliary regiments. The Roman cavalry of the earliest Empire were primarily from Celtic, Hispanic or Germanic areas. Several aspects of training and equipment, such as the four-horned saddle, derived from the Celts, as noted by Arrian and indicated by archaeology.

The Roman navy (Latin: classis, "fleet") not only aided in the supply and transport of the legions but also helped in the protection of the frontiers along the rivers Rhine and Danube. Another of its duties was the protection of the crucial maritime trade routes against the threat of pirates. It patrolled the whole of the Mediterranean, parts of the North Atlantic coasts, and the Black Sea. Nevertheless, the army was considered the senior and more prestigious branch.

Provincial government

An annexed territory became a Roman province in a three-step process: making a register of cities, taking a census of the population, and surveying the land. Further government recordkeeping included births and deaths, real estate transactions, taxes, and juridical proceedings. In the 1st and 2nd centuries, the central government sent out around 160 officials each year to govern outside Italy. Among these officials were the Roman governors: either magistrates elected at Rome who in the name of the Roman people governed senatorial provinces; or governors, usually of equestrian rank, who held their imperium on behalf of the emperor in imperial provinces, most notably Roman Egypt. A governor had to make himself accessible to the people he governed, but he could delegate various duties. His staff, however, was minimal: his official attendants (apparitores), including lictors, heralds, messengers, scribes, and bodyguards; legates, both civil and military, usually of equestrian rank; and friends, ranging in age and experience, who accompanied him unofficially.

Other officials were appointed as supervisors of government finances. Separating fiscal responsibility from justice and administration was a reform of the Imperial era. Under the Republic, provincial governors and tax farmers could exploit local populations for personal gain more freely. Equestrian procurators, whose authority was originally "extra-judicial and extra-constitutional," managed both state-owned property and the vast personal property of the emperor (res privata). Because Roman government officials were few in number, a provincial who needed help with a legal dispute or criminal case might seek out any Roman perceived to have some official capacity, such as a procurator or a military officer, including centurions down to the lowly stationarii or military police.

Roman law

Roman courts held original jurisdiction over cases involving Roman citizens throughout the empire, but there were too few judicial functionaries to impose Roman law uniformly in the provinces. Most parts of the Eastern Empire already had well-established law codes and juridical procedures. In general, it was Roman policy to respect the mos regionis ("regional tradition" or "law of the land") and to regard local laws as a source of legal precedent and social stability. The compatibility of Roman and local law was thought to reflect an underlying ius gentium, the "law of nations" or international law regarded as common and customary among all human communities. If the particulars of provincial law conflicted with Roman law or custom, Roman courts heard appeals, and the emperor held final authority to render a decision.

In the West, law had been administered on a highly localized or tribal basis, and private property rights may have been a novelty of the Roman era, particularly among Celtic peoples. Roman law facilitated the acquisition of wealth by a pro-Roman elite who found their new privileges as citizens to be advantageous. The extension of universal citizenship to all free inhabitants of the Empire in 212 required the uniform application of Roman law, replacing the local law codes that had applied to non-citizens. Diocletian's efforts to stabilize the Empire after the Crisis of the Third Century included two major compilations of law in four years, the Codex Gregorianus and the Codex Hermogenianus, to guide provincial administrators in setting consistent legal standards.

The pervasive exercise of Roman law throughout Western Europe led to its enormous influence on the Western legal tradition, reflected by the continued use of Latin legal terminology in modern law.

Taxation

Taxation under the Empire amounted to about 5% of the Empire's gross product. The typical tax rate paid by individuals ranged from 2 to 5%. The tax code was "bewildering" in its complicated system of direct and indirect taxes, some paid in cash and some in kind. Taxes might be specific to a province, or kinds of properties such as fisheries or salt evaporation ponds; they might be in effect for a limited time. Tax collection was justified by the need to maintain the military, and taxpayers sometimes got a refund if the army captured a surplus of booty. In-kind taxes were accepted from less-monetized areas, particularly those who could supply grain or goods to army camps.

The primary source of direct tax revenue was individuals, who paid a poll tax and a tax on their land, construed as a tax on its produce or productive capacity. Supplemental forms could be filed by those eligible for certain exemptions; for example, Egyptian farmers could register fields as fallow and tax-exempt depending on flood patterns of the Nile. Tax obligations were determined by the census, which required each head of household to appear before the presiding official and provide a headcount of his household, as well as an accounting of property he owned that was suitable for agriculture or habitation.

A major source of indirect-tax revenue was the portoria, customs and tolls on imports and exports, including among provinces. Special taxes were levied on the slave trade. Towards the end of his reign, Augustus instituted a 4% tax on the sale of slaves, which Nero shifted from the purchaser to the dealers, who responded by raising their prices. An owner who manumitted a slave paid a "freedom tax", calculated at 5% of value.

An inheritance tax of 5% was assessed when Roman citizens above a certain net worth left property to anyone but members of their immediate family. Revenues from the estate tax and from a 1% sales tax on auctions went towards the veterans' pension fund (aerarium militare).

Low taxes helped the Roman aristocracy increase their wealth, which equalled or exceeded the revenues of the central government. An emperor sometimes replenished his treasury by confiscating the estates of the "super-rich", but in the later period, the resistance of the wealthy to paying taxes was one of the factors contributing to the collapse of the Empire.

Economy

Scholar Moses Finley was the chief proponent of the primitivist view that the Roman economy was "underdeveloped and underachieving," characterized by subsistence agriculture; urban centres that consumed more than they produced in terms of trade and industry; low-status artisans; slowly developing technology; and a "lack of economic rationality." Current views are more complex. Territorial conquests permitted a large-scale reorganization of land use that resulted in agricultural surplus and specialization, particularly in north Africa. Some cities were known for particular industries or commercial activities, and the scale of building in urban areas indicates a significant construction industry. Papyri preserve complex accounting methods that suggest elements of economic rationalism, and the Empire was highly monetized. Although the means of communication and transport were limited in antiquity, transportation in the 1st and 2nd centuries expanded greatly, and trade routes connected regional economies. The supply contracts for the army, which pervaded every part of the Empire, drew on local suppliers near the base (castrum), throughout the province, and across provincial borders. The Empire is perhaps best thought of as a network of regional economies, based on a form of "political capitalism" in which the state monitored and regulated commerce to assure its own revenues. Economic growth, though not comparable to modern economies, was greater than that of most other societies prior to industrialization.

Socially, economic dynamism opened up one of the avenues of social mobility in the Roman Empire. Social advancement was thus not dependent solely on birth, patronage, good luck, or even extraordinary ability. Although aristocratic values permeated traditional elite society, a strong tendency towards plutocracy is indicated by the wealth requirements for census rank. Prestige could be obtained through investing one's wealth in ways that advertised it appropriately: grand country estates or townhouses, durable luxury items such as jewels and silverware, public entertainments, funerary monuments for family members or coworkers, and religious dedications such as altars. Guilds (collegia) and corporations (corpora) provided support for individuals to succeed through networking, sharing sound business practices, and a willingness to work.

Currency and banking

The early Empire was monetized to a near-universal extent, in the sense of using money as a way to express prices and debts. The sestertius (plural sestertii, English "sesterces", symbolized as HS) was the basic unit of reckoning value into the 4th century, though the silver denarius, worth four sesterces, was used also for accounting beginning in the Severan dynasty. The smallest coin commonly circulated was the bronze as (plural aes or asses), one-tenth denarius. Bullion and ingots seem not to have counted as pecunia ("money") and were used only on the frontiers for transacting business or buying property. Romans in the first and second centuries counted coins, rather than weighing them – an indication that the coin was valued on its face, not for its metal content. This tendency towards fiat money led eventually to the debasement of Roman coinage, with consequences in the later Empire. The standardization of money throughout the Empire promoted trade and market integration. The high amount of metal coinage in circulation increased the money supply for trading or saving.

Rome had no central bank, and regulation of the banking system was minimal. Banks of classical antiquity typically kept less in reserves than the full total of customers' deposits. A typical bank had fairly limited capital, and often only one principal, though a bank might have as many as six to fifteen principals. Seneca assumes that anyone involved in Roman commerce needs access to credit.

A professional deposit banker (argentarius, coactor argentarius, or later nummularius) received and held deposits for a fixed or indefinite term, and lent money to third parties. The senatorial elite were involved heavily in private lending, both as creditors and borrowers, making loans from their personal fortunes on the basis of social connections. The holder of a debt could use it as a means of payment by transferring it to another party, without cash changing hands. Although it has sometimes been thought that ancient Rome lacked "paper" or documentary transactions, the system of banks throughout the Empire also permitted the exchange of very large sums without the physical transfer of coins, in part because of the risks of moving large amounts of cash, particularly by sea. Only one serious credit shortage is known to have occurred in the early Empire, a credit crisis in 33 AD that put a number of senators at risk; the central government rescued the market through a loan of 100 million HS made by the emperor Tiberius to the banks (mensae). Generally, available capital exceeded the amount needed by borrowers.< The central government itself did not borrow money, and without public debt had to fund deficits from cash reserves.

Emperors of the Antonine and Severan dynasties overall debased the currency, particularly the denarius, under the pressures of meeting military payrolls. Sudden inflation during the reign of Commodus damaged the credit market. In the mid-200s, the supply of specie contracted sharply. Conditions during the Crisis of the Third Century—such as reductions in long-distance trade, disruption of mining operations, and the physical transfer of gold coinage outside the empire by invading enemies—greatly diminished the money supply and the banking sector by the year 300. Although Roman coinage had long been fiat money or fiduciary currency, general economic anxieties came to a head under Aurelian, and bankers lost confidence in coins legitimately issued by the central government. Despite Diocletian's introduction of the gold solidus and monetary reforms, the credit market of the Empire never recovered its former robustness.

Mining and metallurgy

The main mining regions of the Empire were the Iberian Peninsula (gold, silver, copper, tin, lead); Gaul (gold, silver, iron); Britain (mainly iron, lead, tin), the Danubian provinces (gold, iron); Macedonia and Thrace (gold, silver); and Asia Minor (gold, silver, iron, tin). Intensive large-scale mining—of alluvial deposits, and by means of open-cast mining and underground mining—took place from the reign of Augustus up to the early 3rd century AD, when the instability of the Empire disrupted production. The gold mines of Dacia, for instance, were no longer available for Roman exploitation after the province was surrendered in 271. Mining seems to have resumed to some extent during the 4th century.

Hydraulic mining, which Pliny referred to as ruina montium ("ruin of the mountains"), allowed base and precious metals to be extracted on a proto-industrial scale. The total annual iron output is estimated at 82,500 tonnes. Copper was produced at an annual rate of 15,000 t, and lead at 80,000 t, both production levels unmatched until the Industrial Revolution; Hispania alone had a 40% share in world lead production. The high lead output was a by-product of extensive silver mining which reached 200 t per annum. At its peak around the mid-2nd century AD, the Roman silver stock is estimated at 10,000 t, five to ten times larger than the combined silver mass of medieval Europe and the Caliphate around 800 AD. As an indication of the scale of Roman metal production, lead pollution in the Greenland ice sheet quadrupled over its prehistoric levels during the Imperial era and dropped again thereafter.

Transportation and communication

The Roman Empire completely encircled the Mediterranean, which they called "our sea" (mare nostrum). Roman sailing vessels navigated the Mediterranean as well as the major rivers of the Empire, including the Guadalquivir, Ebro, Rhône, Rhine, Tiber and Nile. Transport by water was preferred where possible, and moving commodities by land was more difficult. Vehicles, wheels, and ships indicate the existence of a great number of skilled woodworkers.

Land transport utilized the advanced system of Roman roads, which were called "viae". These roads were primarily built for military purposes, but also served commercial ends. The in-kind taxes paid by communities included the provision of personnel, animals, or vehicles for the cursus publicus, the state mail and transport service established by Augustus. Relay stations were located along the roads every seven to twelve Roman miles, and tended to grow into villages or trading posts. A mansio (plural mansiones) was a privately run service station franchised by the imperial bureaucracy for the cursus publicus. The support staff at such a facility included muleteers, secretaries, blacksmiths, cartwrights, a veterinarian, and a few military police and couriers. The distance between mansiones was determined by how far a wagon could travel in a day. Mules were the animal most often used for pulling carts, travelling about 4 mph. As an example of the pace of communication, it took a messenger a minimum of nine days to travel to Rome from Mainz in the province of Germania Superior, even on a matter of urgency. In addition to the mansiones, some taverns offered accommodation as well as food and drink; one recorded tab for a stay showed charges for wine, bread, mule feed, and the services of a prostitute.

Trade and commodities

Roman provinces traded among themselves, but trade extended outside the frontiers to regions as far away as China and India. The main commodity was grain. Chinese trade was mostly conducted overland through middle men along the Silk Road; Indian trade, however, also occurred by sea from Egyptian ports on the Red Sea. Along these trade paths, the horse, upon which Roman expansion and commerce depended, was one of the main channels through which disease spread. Also in transit for trade were olive oil, various foodstuffs, garum (fish sauce), slaves, ore and manufactured metal objects, fibres and textiles, timber, pottery, glassware, marble, papyrus, spices and materia medica, ivory, pearls, and gemstones.

Though most provinces were capable of producing wine, regional varietals were desirable and wine was a central item of trade. Shortages of vin ordinaire were rare. The major suppliers for the city of Rome were the west coast of Italy, southern Gaul, the Tarraconensis region of Hispania, and Crete. Alexandria, the second-largest city, imported wine from Laodicea in Syria and the Aegean. At the retail level, taverns or specialty wine shops (vinaria) sold wine by the jug for carryout and by the drink on premises, with price ranges reflecting quality.

Labour and occupations

Inscriptions record 268 different occupations in the city of Rome, and 85 in Pompeii. Professional associations or trade guilds (collegia) are attested for a wide range of occupations, including fishermen (piscatores), salt merchants (salinatores), olive oil dealers (olivarii), entertainers (scaenici), cattle dealers (pecuarii), goldsmiths (aurifices), teamsters (asinarii or muliones), and stonecutters (lapidarii). These are sometimes quite specialized: one collegium at Rome was strictly limited to craftsmen who worked in ivory and citrus wood.

Work performed by slaves falls into five general categories: domestic, with epitaphs recording at least 55 different household jobs; imperial or public service; urban crafts and services; agriculture; and mining. Convicts provided much of the labour in the mines or quarries, where conditions were notoriously brutal. In practice, there was little division of labour between slave and free, and most workers were illiterate and without special skills. The greatest number of common labourers were employed in agriculture: in the Italian system of industrial farming (latifundia), these may have been mostly slaves, but throughout the Empire, slave farm labour was probably less important than other forms of dependent labour by people who were technically not enslaved.

Textile and clothing production was a major source of employment. Both textiles and finished garments were traded among the peoples of the Empire, whose products were often named for them or a particular town, rather like a fashion "label". Better ready-to-wear was exported by businessmen (negotiatores or mercatores) who were often well-to-do residents of the production centres. Finished garments might be retailed by their sales agents, who travelled to potential customers, or by vestiarii, clothing dealers who were mostly freedmen; or they might be peddled by itinerant merchants. In Egypt, textile producers could run prosperous small businesses employing apprentices, free workers earning wages, and slaves. The fullers (fullones) and dye workers (coloratores) had their own guilds. Centonarii were guild workers who specialized in textile production and the recycling of old clothes into pieced goods.

GDP and income distribution

Economic historians vary in their calculations of the gross domestic product of the Roman economy during the Principate. In the sample years of 14, 100, and 150 AD, estimates of per capita GDP range from 166 to 380 HS. The GDP per capita of Italy is estimated as 40 to 66% higher than in the rest of the Empire, due to tax transfers from the provinces and the concentration of elite income in the heartland. In regard to Italy, "there can be little doubt that the lower classes of Pompeii, Herculaneum, and other provincial towns of the Roman Empire enjoyed a high standard of living not equaled again in Western Europe until the 19th century AD".

In the Scheidel–Friesen economic model, the total annual income generated by the Empire is placed at nearly 20 billion HS, with about 5% extracted by central and local government. Households in the top 1.5% of income distribution captured about 20% of income. Another 20% went to about 10% of the population who can be characterized as a non-elite middle. The remaining "vast majority" produced more than half of the total income, but lived near subsistence. The elite were 1.2–1.7% and the middling "who enjoyed modest, comfortable levels of existence but not extreme wealth amounted to 6–12% (...) while the vast majority lived around subsistence".

Architecture and engineering

The chief Roman contributions to architecture were the arch, vault and the dome. Even after more than 2,000 years some Roman structures still stand, due in part to sophisticated methods of making cements and concrete. Roman roads are considered the most advanced roads built until the early 19th century. The system of roadways facilitated military policing, communications, and trade. The roads were resistant to floods and other environmental hazards. Even after the collapse of the central government, some roads remained usable for more than a thousand years.

Roman bridges were among the first large and lasting bridges, built from stone with the arch as the basic structure. Most used concrete as well. The largest Roman bridge was Trajan's bridge over the lower Danube, constructed by Apollodorus of Damascus, which remained for over a millennium the longest bridge to have been built, both in overall span and length.

The Romans built many dams and reservoirs for water collection, such as the Subiaco Dams, two of which fed the Anio Novus, one of the largest aqueducts of Rome. They built 72 dams just on the Iberian peninsula, and many more are known across the Empire, some still in use. Several earthen dams are known from Roman Britain, including a well-preserved example from Longovicium (Lanchester).

The Romans constructed numerous aqueducts. A surviving treatise by Frontinus, who served as curator aquarum (water commissioner) under Nerva, reflects the administrative importance placed on ensuring the water supply. Masonry channels carried water from distant springs and reservoirs along a precise gradient, using gravity alone. After the water passed through the aqueduct, it was collected in tanks and fed through pipes to public fountains, baths, toilets, or industrial sites. The main aqueducts in the city of Rome were the Aqua Claudia and the Aqua Marcia. The complex system built to supply Constantinople had its most distant supply drawn from over 120 km away along a sinuous route of more than 336 km. Roman aqueducts were built to remarkably fine tolerance, and to a technological standard that was not to be equalled until modern times. The Romans also made use of aqueducts in their extensive mining operations across the empire, at sites such as Las Medulas and Dolaucothi in South Wales.

Insulated glazing (or "double glazing") was used in the construction of public baths. Elite housing in cooler climates might have hypocausts, a form of central heating. The Romans were the first culture to assemble all essential components of the much later steam engine, when Hero built the aeolipile. With the crank and connecting rod system, all elements for constructing a steam engine (invented in 1712)—Hero's aeolipile (generating steam power), the cylinder and piston (in metal force pumps), non-return valves (in water pumps), gearing (in water mills and clocks)—were known in Roman times.

Health and disease

Epidemics were common in the ancient world, and occasional pandemics in the Roman Empire killed millions of people. The Roman population was unhealthy. About 20 percent of the population—a large percentage by ancient standards—lived in one of hundreds of cities, Rome, with a population estimated at one million, being the largest. The cities were a "demographic sink," even in the best of times. The death rate exceeded the birth rate and a constant in-migration of new residents was necessary to maintain the urban population. Average length of life is estimated at the mid-twenties, and perhaps more than half of children died before reaching adulthood. Dense urban populations and poor sanitation contributed to the dangers of disease. The connectivity by land and sea between the vast territories of the Roman Empire made the transfer of infectious diseases from one region to another easier and more rapid than it was in smaller, more geographically confined societies. The rich were not immune to the unhealthy conditions. Only two of emperor Marcus Aurelius's fourteen children are known to have reached adulthood.

A good indicator of nutrition and the disease burden is the average height of the population. The conclusion of the study of thousands of skeletons is that the average Roman was shorter in stature than the population of pre-Roman societies in Italy and the post-Roman societies in Europe during the Middle Ages. The conclusion of historian Kyle Harper is that "not for the last time in history, a precocious leap forward in social development brought biological reverses."

Daily life

City and country
In the ancient world, a city was viewed as a place that fostered civilization by being "properly designed, ordered, and adorned." Augustus undertook a vast building programme in Rome, supported public displays of art that expressed the new imperial ideology, and reorganized the city into neighbourhoods (vici) administered at the local level with police and firefighting services. A focus of Augustan monumental architecture was the Campus Martius, an open area outside the city centre that in early times had been devoted to equestrian sports and physical training for youth. The Altar of Augustan Peace (Ara Pacis Augustae) was located there, as was an obelisk imported from Egypt that formed the pointer (gnomon) of a horologium. With its public gardens, the Campus became one of the most attractive places in the city to visit.

City planning and urban lifestyles had been influenced by the Greeks from an early period, and in the Eastern Empire, Roman rule accelerated and shaped the local development of cities that already had a strong Hellenistic character. Cities such as Athens, Aphrodisias, Ephesus and Gerasa altered some aspects of city planning and architecture to conform to imperial ideals, while also expressing their individual identity and regional preeminence. In the areas of the Western Empire inhabited by Celtic-speaking peoples, Rome encouraged the development of urban centres with stone temples, forums, monumental fountains, and amphitheatres, often on or near the sites of the preexisting walled settlements known as oppida. Urbanization in Roman Africa expanded on Greek and Punic cities along the coast.

The network of cities throughout the Empire (coloniae, municipia, civitates or in Greek terms poleis) was a primary cohesive force during the Pax Romana. Romans of the 1st and 2nd centuries AD were encouraged by imperial propaganda to "inculcate the habits of peacetime". As the classicist Clifford Ando has noted:

Even the Christian polemicist Tertullian declared that the world of the late 2nd century was more orderly and well-cultivated than in earlier times: "Everywhere there are houses, everywhere people, everywhere the res publica, the commonwealth, everywhere life." The decline of cities and civic life in the 4th century, when the wealthy classes were unable or disinclined to support public works, was one sign of the Empire's imminent dissolution.

In the city of Rome, most people lived in multistory apartment buildings (insulae) that were often squalid firetraps. Public facilities—such as baths (thermae), toilets that were flushed with running water (latrinae), conveniently located basins or elaborate fountains (nymphea) delivering fresh water, and large-scale entertainments such as chariot races and gladiator combat—were aimed primarily at the common people who lived in the insulae. Similar facilities were constructed in cities throughout the Empire, and some of the best-preserved Roman structures are in Spain, southern France, and northern Africa.

The public baths served hygienic, social and cultural functions. Bathing was the focus of daily socializing in the late afternoon before dinner. Roman baths were distinguished by a series of rooms that offered communal bathing in three temperatures, with varying amenities that might include an exercise and weight-training room, sauna, exfoliation spa (where oils were massaged into the skin and scraped from the body with a strigil), ball court, or outdoor swimming pool. Baths had hypocaust heating: the floors were suspended over hot-air channels that circulated warmth. Mixed nude bathing was not unusual in the early Empire, though some baths may have offered separate facilities or hours for men and women. Public baths were a part of urban culture throughout the provinces, but in the late 4th century, individual tubs began to replace communal bathing. Christians were advised to go to the baths for health and cleanliness, not pleasure, but to avoid the games (ludi), which were part of religious festivals they considered "pagan". Tertullian says that otherwise Christians not only availed themselves of the baths, but participated fully in commerce and society.

Rich families from Rome usually had two or more houses, a townhouse (domus, plural domūs) and at least one luxury home (villa) outside the city. The domus was a privately owned single-family house, and might be furnished with a private bath (balneum), but it was not a place to retreat from public life. Although some neighbourhoods of Rome show a higher concentration of well-to-do houses, the rich did not live in segregated enclaves. Their houses were meant to be visible and accessible. The atrium served as a reception hall in which the paterfamilias (head of household) met with clients every morning, from wealthy friends to poorer dependents who received charity. It was also a centre of family religious rites, containing a shrine and the images of family ancestors. The houses were located on busy public roads, and ground-level spaces facing the street were often rented out as shops (tabernae). In addition to a kitchen garden—windowboxes might substitute in the insulae—townhouses typically enclosed a peristyle garden that brought a tract of nature, made orderly, within walls.

The villa by contrast was an escape from the bustle of the city, and in literature represents a lifestyle that balances the civilized pursuit of intellectual and artistic interests (otium) with an appreciation of nature and the agricultural cycle. Ideally a villa commanded a view or vista, carefully framed by the architectural design. It might be located on a working estate, or in a "resort town" situated on the seacoast, such as Pompeii and Herculaneum.

The programme of urban renewal under Augustus, and the growth of Rome's population to as many as 1 million people, was accompanied by a nostalgia for rural life expressed in the arts. Poetry praised the idealized lives of farmers and shepherds. The interiors of houses were often decorated with painted gardens, fountains, landscapes, vegetative ornament, and animals, especially birds and marine life, rendered accurately enough that modern scholars can sometimes identify them by species. The Augustan poet Horace gently satirized the dichotomy of urban and rural values in his fable of the city mouse and the country mouse, which has often been retold as a children's story.

On a more practical level, the central government took an active interest in supporting agriculture. Producing food was the top priority of land use. Larger farms (latifundia) achieved an economy of scale that sustained urban life and its more specialized division of labour. Small farmers benefited from the development of local markets in towns and trade centres. Agricultural techniques such as crop rotation and selective breeding were disseminated throughout the Empire, and new crops were introduced from one province to another, such as peas and cabbage to Britain.

Maintaining an affordable food supply to the city of Rome had become a major political issue in the late Republic, when the state began to provide a grain dole (Cura Annonae) to citizens who registered for it. About 200,000–250,000 adult males in Rome received the dole, amounting to about 33 kg. per month, for a per annum total of about 100,000 tons of wheat primarily from Sicily, north Africa, and Egypt. The dole cost at least 15% of state revenues, but improved living conditions and family life among the lower classes, and subsidized the rich by allowing workers to spend more of their earnings on the wine and olive oil produced on the estates of the landowning class.

The grain dole also had symbolic value: it affirmed both the emperor's position as universal benefactor, and the right of all citizens to share in "the fruits of conquest". The annona, public facilities, and spectacular entertainments mitigated the otherwise dreary living conditions of lower-class Romans, and kept social unrest in check. The satirist Juvenal, however, saw "bread and circuses" (panem et circenses) as emblematic of the loss of republican political liberty:

Food and dining

Most apartments in Rome lacked kitchens, though a charcoal brazier could be used for rudimentary cookery. Prepared food was sold at pubs and bars, inns, and food stalls (tabernae, cauponae, popinae, thermopolia). Carryout and restaurant dining were for the lower classes; fine dining could be sought only at private dinner parties in  houses with a chef (archimagirus) and trained kitchen staff, or at banquets hosted by social clubs (collegia).

Most people would have consumed at least 70% of their daily calories in the form of cereals and legumes. Puls (pottage) was considered the aboriginal food of the Romans. The basic grain pottage could be elaborated with chopped vegetables, bits of meat, cheese, or herbs to produce dishes similar to polenta or risotto.

Urban populations and the military preferred to consume their grain in the form of bread. Mills and commercial ovens were usually combined in a bakery complex. By the reign of Aurelian, the state had begun to distribute the annona as a daily ration of bread baked in state factories, and added olive oil, wine, and pork to the dole.

The importance of a good diet to health was recognized by medical writers such as Galen (2nd century AD), whose treatises included one On Barley Soup. Views on nutrition were influenced by schools of thought such as humoral theory.

Roman literature focuses on the dining habits of the upper classes, for whom the evening meal (cena) had important social functions. Guests were entertained in a finely decorated dining room (triclinium), often with a view of the peristyle garden. Diners lounged on couches, leaning on the left elbow. By the late Republic, if not earlier, women dined, reclined, and drank wine along with men.

The most famous description of a Roman meal is probably Trimalchio's dinner party in the Satyricon, a fictional extravaganza that bears little resemblance to reality even among the most wealthy. The poet Martial describes serving a more plausible dinner, beginning with the gustatio ("tasting" or "appetizer"), which was a salad composed of mallow leaves, lettuce, chopped leeks, mint, arugula, mackerel garnished with rue, sliced eggs, and marinated sow udder. The main course was succulent cuts of kid, beans, greens, a chicken, and leftover ham, followed by a dessert of fresh fruit and vintage wine. The Latin expression for a full-course dinner was ab ovo usque mala, "from the egg to the apples," equivalent to the English "from soup to nuts."

A book-length collection of Roman recipes is attributed to Apicius, a name for several figures in antiquity that became synonymous with "gourmet." Roman "foodies" indulged in wild game, fowl such as peacock and flamingo, large fish (mullet was especially prized), and shellfish. Luxury ingredients were brought by the fleet from the far reaches of empire, from the Parthian frontier to the Straits of Gibraltar.

Refined cuisine could be moralized as a sign of either civilized progress or decadent decline. The early Imperial historian Tacitus contrasted the indulgent luxuries of the Roman table in his day with the simplicity of the Germanic diet of fresh wild meat, foraged fruit, and cheese, unadulterated by imported seasonings and elaborate sauces. Most often, because of the importance of landowning in Roman culture, produce—cereals, legumes, vegetables, and fruit—was considered a more civilized form of food than meat. The Mediterranean staples of bread, wine, and oil were sacralized by Roman Christianity, while Germanic meat consumption became a mark of paganism, as it might be the product of animal sacrifice.

Some philosophers and Christians resisted the demands of the body and the pleasures of food, and adopted fasting as an ideal. Food became simpler in general as urban life in the West diminished, trade routes were disrupted, and the rich retreated to the more limited self-sufficiency of their country estates. As an urban lifestyle came to be associated with decadence, the Church formally discouraged gluttony, and hunting and pastoralism were seen as simple, virtuous ways of life.

Recreation and spectacles

When Juvenal complained that the Roman people had exchanged their political liberty for "bread and circuses", he was referring to the state-provided grain dole and the circenses, events held in the entertainment venue called a circus in Latin. The largest such venue in Rome was the Circus Maximus, the setting of horse races, chariot races, the equestrian Troy Game, staged beast hunts (venationes), athletic contests, gladiator combat, and historical re-enactments. From earliest times, several religious festivals had featured games (ludi), primarily horse and chariot races (ludi circenses). Although their entertainment value tended to overshadow ritual significance, the races remained part of archaic religious observances that pertained to agriculture, initiation, and the cycle of birth and death.

Under Augustus, public entertainments were presented on 77 days of the year; by the reign of Marcus Aurelius, the number of days had expanded to 135. Circus games were preceded by an elaborate parade (pompa circensis) that ended at the venue. Competitive events were held also in smaller venues such as the amphitheatre, which became the characteristic Roman spectacle venue, and stadium. Greek-style athletics included footraces, boxing, wrestling, and the pancratium. Aquatic displays, such as the mock sea battle (naumachia) and a form of "water ballet", were presented in engineered pools. State-supported theatrical events (ludi scaenici) took place on temple steps or in grand stone theatres, or in the smaller enclosed theatre called an odeon.

Circuses were the largest structure regularly built in the Roman world, though the Greeks had their own architectural traditions for the similarly purposed hippodrome. The Flavian Amphitheatre, better known as the Colosseum, became the regular arena for blood sports in Rome after it opened in 80 AD. The circus races continued to be held more frequently. The Circus Maximus could seat around 150,000 spectators, and the Colosseum about 50,000 with standing room for about 10,000 more. Many Roman amphitheatres, circuses and theatres built in cities outside Italy are visible as ruins today. The local ruling elite were responsible for sponsoring spectacles and arena events, which both enhanced their status and drained their resources.

The physical arrangement of the amphitheatre represented the order of Roman society: the emperor presiding in his opulent box; senators and equestrians watching from the advantageous seats reserved for them; women seated at a remove from the action; slaves given the worst places, and everybody else packed in-between. The crowd could call for an outcome by booing or cheering, but the emperor had the final say. Spectacles could quickly become sites of social and political protest, and emperors sometimes had to deploy force to put down crowd unrest, most notoriously at the Nika riots in the year 532, when troops under Justinian slaughtered thousands.

The chariot teams were known by the colours they wore, with the Blues and Greens the most popular. Fan loyalty was fierce and at times erupted into sports riots. Racing was perilous, but charioteers were among the most celebrated and well-compensated athletes. One star of the sport was Diocles from Lusitania (present-day Portugal), who raced chariots for 24 years and had career earnings of 35 million sesterces. Horses had their fans too, and were commemorated in art and inscriptions, sometimes by name. The design of Roman circuses was developed to assure that no team had an unfair advantage and to minimize collisions (naufragia), which were nonetheless frequent and spectacularly satisfying to the crowd. The races retained a magical aura through their early association with chthonic rituals: circus images were considered protective or lucky, curse tablets have been found buried at the site of racetracks, and charioteers were often suspected of sorcery. Chariot racing continued into the Byzantine period under imperial sponsorship, but the decline of cities in the 6th and 7th centuries led to its eventual demise.

The Romans thought gladiator contests had originated with funeral games and sacrifices in which select captive warriors were forced to fight to expiate the deaths of noble Romans. Some of the earliest styles of gladiator fighting had ethnic designations such as "Thracian" or "Gallic". The staged combats were considered munera, "services, offerings, benefactions", initially distinct from the festival games (ludi).

Throughout his 40-year reign, Augustus presented eight gladiator shows in which a total of 10,000 men fought, as well as 26 staged beast hunts that resulted in the deaths of 3,500 animals. To mark the opening of the Colosseum, the emperor Titus presented 100 days of arena events, with 3,000 gladiators competing on a single day. Roman fascination with gladiators is indicated by how widely they are depicted on mosaics, wall paintings, lamps, and in graffiti.

Gladiators were trained combatants who might be slaves, convicts, or free volunteers. Death was not a necessary or even desirable outcome in matches between these highly skilled fighters, whose training represented a costly and time-consuming investment. By contrast, noxii were convicts sentenced to the arena with little or no training, often unarmed, and with no expectation of survival. Physical suffering and humiliation were considered appropriate retributive justice for the crimes they had committed. These executions were sometimes staged or ritualized as re-enactments of myths, and amphitheatres were equipped with elaborate stage machinery to create special effects. Tertullian considered deaths in the arena to be nothing more than a dressed-up form of human sacrifice.

Modern scholars have found the pleasure Romans took in the "theatre of life and death" to be one of the more difficult aspects of their civilization to understand and explain. The younger Pliny rationalized gladiator spectacles as good for the people, a way "to inspire them to face honourable wounds and despise death, by exhibiting love of glory and desire for victory even in the bodies of slaves and criminals". Some Romans such as Seneca were critical of the brutal spectacles, but found virtue in the courage and dignity of the defeated fighter rather than in victory—an attitude that finds its fullest expression with the Christians martyred in the arena. Even martyr literature, however, offers "detailed, indeed luxuriant, descriptions of bodily suffering", and became a popular genre at times indistinguishable from fiction.

Personal training and play

In the plural, ludi almost always refers to the large-scale spectator games. The singular ludus, "play, game, sport, training," had a wide range of meanings such as "word play," "theatrical performance," "board game," "primary school," and even "gladiator training school" (as in Ludus Magnus, the largest such training camp at Rome).

Activities for children and young people included hoop rolling and knucklebones (astragali or "jacks"). The sarcophagi of children often show them playing games. Girls had dolls, typically 15–16 cm tall with jointed limbs, made of materials such as wood, terracotta, and especially bone and ivory. Ball games include trigon, which required dexterity, and harpastum, a rougher sport. Pets appear often on children's memorials and in literature, including birds, dogs, cats, goats, sheep, rabbits and geese.

After adolescence, most physical training for males was of a military nature. The Campus Martius originally was an exercise field where young men developed the skills of horsemanship and warfare. Hunting was also considered an appropriate pastime. According to Plutarch, conservative Romans disapproved of Greek-style athletics that promoted a fine body for its own sake, and condemned Nero's efforts to encourage gymnastic games in the Greek manner.

Some women trained as gymnasts and dancers, and a rare few as female gladiators. The famous "Bikini Girls" mosaic shows young women engaging in apparatus routines that might be compared to rhythmic gymnastics. Women, in general, were encouraged to maintain their health through activities such as playing ball, swimming, walking, reading aloud (as a breathing exercise), riding in vehicles, and travel.

People of all ages played board games pitting two players against each other, including latrunculi ("Raiders"), a game of strategy in which opponents coordinated the movements and capture of multiple game pieces, and XII scripta ("Twelve Marks"), involving dice and arranging pieces on a grid of letters or words. A game referred to as alea (dice) or tabula (the board), to which the emperor Claudius was notoriously addicted, may have been similar to backgammon, using a dice-cup (pyrgus). Playing with dice as a form of gambling was disapproved of, but was a popular pastime during the December festival of the Saturnalia with its carnival, norms-overturned atmosphere.

Clothing

In a status-conscious society like that of the Romans, clothing and personal adornment gave immediate visual clues about the etiquette of interacting with the wearer. Wearing the correct clothing was supposed to reflect a society in good order. The toga was the distinctive national garment of the Roman male citizen, but it was heavy and impractical, worn mainly for conducting political business and religious rites, and for going to court. The clothing Romans wore ordinarily was dark or colourful, and the most common male attire seen daily throughout the provinces would have been tunics, cloaks, and in some regions trousers. The study of how Romans dressed in daily life is complicated by a lack of direct evidence, since portraiture may show the subject in clothing with symbolic value, and surviving textiles from the period are rare.

The Imperial toga was a "vast expanse" of semi-circular white wool that could not be put on and draped correctly without assistance. In his work on oratory, Quintilian describes in detail how the public speaker ought to orchestrate his gestures in relation to his toga. In art, the toga is shown with the long end dipping between the feet, a deep curved fold in front, and a bulbous flap at the midsection. The drapery became more intricate and structured over time, with the cloth forming a tight roll across the chest in later periods. The toga praetexta, with a purple or purplish-red stripe representing inviolability, was worn by children who had not come of age, curule magistrates, and state priests. Only the emperor could wear an all-purple toga (toga picta).

The basic garment for all Romans, regardless of gender or wealth, was the simple sleeved tunic. The length differed by wearer: a man's reached mid-calf, but a soldier's was somewhat shorter; a woman's fell to her feet, and a child's to its knees. The tunics of poor people and labouring slaves were made from coarse wool in natural, dull shades, with the length determined by the type of work they did. Finer tunics were made of lightweight wool or linen. A man who belonged to the senatorial or equestrian order wore a tunic with two purple stripes (clavi) woven vertically into the fabric: the wider the stripe, the higher the wearer's status. Other garments could be layered over the tunic.

In the 2nd century, emperors and men of status are often portrayed wearing the pallium, an originally Greek mantle (himation) folded tightly around the body. Women are also portrayed in the pallium. Tertullian considered the pallium an appropriate garment both for Christians, in contrast to the toga, and for educated people, since it was associated with philosophers. By the 4th century, the toga had been more or less replaced by the pallium as a garment that embodied social unity.

Roman clothing styles changed over time, though not as rapidly as fashions today. In the Dominate, clothing worn by both soldiers and government bureaucrats became highly decorated, with woven or embroidered stripes (clavi) and circular roundels (orbiculi) applied to tunics and cloaks. These decorative elements consisted of geometrical patterns, stylized plant motifs, and in more elaborate examples, human or animal figures. The use of silk increased, and courtiers of the later Empire wore elaborate silk robes. The militarization of Roman society, and the waning of cultural life based on urban ideals, affected habits of dress: heavy military-style belts were worn by bureaucrats as well as soldiers, and the toga was abandoned.

Arts

People visiting or living in Rome or the cities throughout the Empire would have seen art in a range of styles and media on a daily basis. Public or official art—including sculpture, monuments such as victory columns or triumphal arches, and the iconography on coins—is often analysed for its historical significance or as an expression of imperial ideology. At Imperial public baths, a person of humble means could view wall paintings, mosaics, statues, and interior decoration often of high quality. In the private sphere, objects made for religious dedications, funerary commemoration, domestic use, and commerce can show varying degrees of esthetic quality and artistic skill. A wealthy person might advertise his appreciation of culture through painting, sculpture, and decorative arts at his home—though some efforts strike modern viewers and some ancient connoisseurs as strenuous rather than tasteful. Greek art had a profound influence on the Roman tradition, and some of the most famous examples of Greek statues are known only from Roman Imperial versions and the occasional description in a Greek or Latin literary source.

Despite the high value placed on works of art, even famous artists were of low social status among the Greeks and Romans, who regarded artists, artisans, and craftsmen alike as manual labourers. At the same time, the level of skill required to produce quality work was recognized, and even considered a divine gift.

Portraiture

Portraiture, which survives mainly in the medium of sculpture, was the most copious form of imperial art. Portraits during the Augustan period utilize youthful and classical proportions, evolving later into a mixture of realism and idealism. Republican portraits had been characterized by a "warts and all" verism, but as early as the 2nd century BC, the Greek convention of heroic nudity was adopted sometimes for portraying conquering generals. Imperial portrait sculptures may model the head as mature, even craggy, atop a nude or seminude body that is smooth and youthful with perfect musculature; a portrait head might even be added to a body created for another purpose. Clothed in the toga or military regalia, the body communicates rank or sphere of activity, not the characteristics of the individual.

Women of the emperor's family were often depicted dressed as goddesses or divine personifications such as Pax ("Peace"). Portraiture in painting is represented primarily by the Fayum mummy portraits, which evoke Egyptian and Roman traditions of commemorating the dead with the realistic painting techniques of the Empire. Marble portrait sculpture would have been painted, and while traces of paint have only rarely survived the centuries, the Fayum portraits indicate why ancient literary sources marvelled at how lifelike artistic representations could be.

Sculpture and sarcophagi

Examples of Roman sculpture survive abundantly, though often in damaged or fragmentary condition, including freestanding statues and statuettes in marble, bronze and terracotta, and reliefs from public buildings, temples, and monuments such as the Ara Pacis, Trajan's Column, and the Arch of Titus. Niches in amphitheatres such as the Colosseum were originally filled with statues, and no formal garden was complete without statuary.

Temples housed the cult images of deities, often by famed sculptors. The religiosity of the Romans encouraged the production of decorated altars, small representations of deities for the household shrine or votive offerings, and other pieces for dedicating at temples.

Elaborately carved marble and limestone sarcophagi are characteristic of the 2nd to the 4th centuries with at least 10,000 examples surviving. Although mythological scenes have been most widely studied, sarcophagus relief has been called the "richest single source of Roman iconography," and may also depict the deceased's occupation or life course, military scenes, and other subject matter. The same workshops produced sarcophagi with Jewish or Christian imagery.

Painting

Romans absorbed their initial paint models and techniques in part from Etruscan painting and in part from Greek painting.

Examples of Roman paintings can be found in a few palaces (mostly found in Rome and surroundings), in many catacombs and in some villas such as the villa of Livia.

Much of what is known of Roman painting is based on the interior decoration of private homes, particularly as preserved at Pompeii, Herculaneum and Stabiae by the eruption of Vesuvius in 79 AD. In addition to decorative borders and panels with geometric or vegetative motifs, wall painting depicts scenes from mythology and the theatre, landscapes and gardens, recreation and spectacles, work and everyday life, and erotic art.

A unique source for Jewish figurative painting under the Empire is the Dura-Europos synagogue, dubbed "the Pompeii of the Syrian Desert,"

Mosaic

Mosaics are among the most enduring of Roman decorative arts, and are found on the surfaces of floors and other architectural features such as walls, vaulted ceilings, and columns. The most common form is the tessellated mosaic, formed from uniform pieces (tesserae) of materials such as stone and glass. Mosaics were usually crafted on site, but sometimes assembled and shipped as ready-made panels. A mosaic workshop was led by the master artist (pictor) who worked with two grades of assistants.

Figurative mosaics share many themes with painting, and in some cases portray subject matter in almost identical compositions. Although geometric patterns and mythological scenes occur throughout the Empire, regional preferences also find expression. In North Africa, a particularly rich source of mosaics, homeowners often chose scenes of life on their estates, hunting, agriculture, and local wildlife. Plentiful and major examples of Roman mosaics come also from present-day Turkey, Italy, southern France, Spain, and Portugal. More than 300 Antioch mosaics from the 3rd century are known.

Opus sectile is a related technique in which flat stone, usually coloured marble, is cut precisely into shapes from which geometric or figurative patterns are formed. This more difficult technique was highly prized and became especially popular for luxury surfaces in the 4th century, an abundant example of which is the Basilica of Junius Bassus.

Decorative arts

Decorative arts for luxury consumers included fine pottery, silver and bronze vessels and implements, and glassware. The manufacture of pottery in a wide range of quality was important to trade and employment, as were the glass and metalworking industries. Imports stimulated new regional centres of production. Southern Gaul became a leading producer of the finer red-gloss pottery (terra sigillata) that was a major item of trade in 1st-century Europe. Glassblowing was regarded by the Romans as originating in Syria in the 1st century BC, and by the 3rd century, Egypt and the Rhineland had become noted for fine glass.

Performing arts

In Roman tradition, borrowed from the Greeks, literary theatre was performed by all-male troupes that used face masks with exaggerated facial expressions that allowed audiences to "see" how a character was feeling. Such masks were occasionally also specific to a particular role, and an actor could then play multiple roles merely by switching masks. Female roles were played by men in drag (travesti). Roman literary theatre tradition is particularly well represented in Latin literature by the tragedies of Seneca. The circumstances under which Seneca's tragedies were performed are however unclear; scholarly conjectures range from minimally staged readings to full production pageants. 

More popular than literary theatre was the genre-defying mimus theatre, which featured scripted scenarios with free improvization, risqué language and jokes, sex scenes, action sequences, and political satire, along with dance numbers, juggling, acrobatics, tightrope walking, striptease, and dancing bears. Unlike literary theatre, mimus was played without masks, and encouraged stylistic realism in acting. Female roles were performed by women, not by men. Mimus was related to the genre called pantomimus, an early form of story ballet that contained no spoken dialogue. Pantomimus combined expressive dancing, instrumental music and a sung libretto, often mythological, that could be either tragic or comic.

Although sometimes regarded as foreign elements in Roman culture, music and dance had existed in Rome from earliest times. Music was customary at funerals, and the tibia (Greek aulos), a woodwind instrument, was played at sacrifices to ward off ill influences. Song (carmen) was an integral part of almost every social occasion. The Carmen saeculare of Horace, commissioned by Augustus, was performed publicly in 17 BC by a mixed children's choir. Music was thought to reflect the orderliness of the cosmos, and was associated particularly with mathematics and knowledge.

Various woodwinds and "brass" instruments were played, as were stringed instruments such as the cithara, and percussion. The cornu, a long tubular metal wind instrument that curved around the musician's body, was used for military signals and on parade. These instruments are found in parts of the Empire where they did not originate and indicate that music was among the aspects of Roman culture that spread throughout the provinces. Instruments are widely depicted in Roman art.

The hydraulic pipe organ (hydraulis) was "one of the most significant technical and musical achievements of antiquity", and accompanied gladiator games and events in the amphitheatre, as well as stage performances. It was among the instruments that the Emperor Nero played.

Although certain forms of dance were disapproved of at times as non-Roman or unmanly, dancing was embedded in religious rituals of archaic Rome, such as those of the dancing armed Salian priests and of the Arval Brothers, priesthoods which underwent a revival during the Principate. Ecstatic dancing was a feature of the international mystery religions, particularly the cult of Cybele as practiced by her eunuch priests the Galli and of Isis. In the secular realm, dancing girls from Syria and Cadiz were extremely popular.

Like gladiators, entertainers were infames in the eyes of the law, little better than slaves even if they were technically free. "Stars", however, could enjoy considerable wealth and celebrity, and mingled socially and often sexually with the upper classes, including emperors. Performers supported each other by forming guilds, and several memorials for members of the theatre community survive. Theatre and dance were often condemned by Christian polemicists in the later Empire, and Christians who integrated dance traditions and music into their worship practices were regarded by the Church Fathers as shockingly "pagan." St. Augustine is supposed to have said that bringing clowns, actors, and dancers into a house was like inviting in a gang of unclean spirits.

Literacy, books, and education

Estimates of the average literacy rate in the Empire range from 5 to 30% or higher, depending in part on the definition of "literacy". The Roman obsession with documents and public inscriptions indicates the high value placed on the written word. The Imperial bureaucracy was so dependent on writing that the Babylonian Talmud declared "if all seas were ink, all reeds were pen, all skies parchment, and all men scribes, they would be unable to set down the full scope of the Roman government's concerns." Laws and edicts were posted in writing as well as read out. Illiterate Roman subjects would have someone such as a government scribe (scriba) read or write their official documents for them. Public art and religious ceremonies were ways to communicate imperial ideology regardless of ability to read. The Romans had an extensive priestly archive, and inscriptions appear throughout the Empire in connection with statues and small votives dedicated by ordinary people to divinities, as well as on binding tablets and other "magic spells", with hundreds of examples collected in the Greek Magical Papyri. The military produced a vast amount of written reports and service records, and literacy in the army was "strikingly high". Urban graffiti, which include literary quotations, and low-quality inscriptions with misspellings and solecisms indicate casual literacy among non-elites. In addition, numeracy was necessary for any form of commerce. Slaves were numerate and literate in significant numbers, and some were highly educated.

Books were expensive, since each copy had to be written out individually on a roll of papyrus (volumen) by scribes who had apprenticed to the trade. The codex—a book with pages bound to a spine—was still a novelty in the time of the poet Martial (1st century AD), but by the end of the 3rd century was replacing the volumen and was the regular form for books with Christian content. Commercial production of books had been established by the late Republic, and by the 1st century AD certain neighbourhoods of Rome were known for their bookshops (tabernae librariae), which were found also in Western provincial cities such as Lugdunum (present-day Lyon, France). The quality of editing varied wildly, and some ancient authors complain about error-ridden copies, as well as plagiarism or forgery, since there was no copyright law. A skilled slave copyist (servus litteratus) could be valued as highly as 100,000 sesterces.

Collectors amassed personal libraries, such as that of the Villa of the Papyri in Herculaneum, and a fine library was part of the cultivated leisure (otium) associated with the villa lifestyle. Significant collections might attract "in-house" scholars; Lucian mocked mercenary Greek intellectuals who attached themselves to philistine Roman patrons. An individual benefactor might endow a community with a library: Pliny the Younger gave the city of Comum a library valued at 1 million sesterces, along with another 100,000 to maintain it. Imperial libraries housed in state buildings were open to users as a privilege on a limited basis, and represented a literary canon from which disreputable writers could be excluded. Books considered subversive might be publicly burned, and Domitian crucified copyists for reproducing works deemed treasonous.

Literary texts were often shared aloud at meals or with reading groups. Scholars such as Pliny the Elder engaged in "multitasking" by having works read aloud to them while they dined, bathed or travelled, times during which they might also dictate drafts or notes to their secretaries. The multivolume Attic Nights of Aulus Gellius is an extended exploration of how Romans constructed their literary culture. The reading public (recitationes) expanded from the 1st through the 3rd century, and while those who read for pleasure remained a minority, they were no longer confined to a sophisticated ruling elite, reflecting the social fluidity of the Empire as a whole and giving rise to "consumer literature" meant for entertainment. Illustrated books, including erotica, were popular, but are poorly represented by extant fragments.

Primary education

Traditional Roman education was moral and practical. Stories about great men and women, or cautionary tales about individual failures, were meant to instil Roman values (mores maiorum). Parents and family members were expected to act as role models, and parents who worked for a living passed their skills on to their children, who might also enter apprenticeships for more advanced training in crafts or trades. Formal education was available only to children from families who could pay for it, and the lack of state intervention in access to education contributed to the low rate of literacy.

Young children were attended by a paedagogus, or less frequently a female pedagoga, usually a Greek slave or former slave. The pedagogue kept the child safe, taught self-discipline and public behaviour, attended class and helped with tutoring. The Emperor Julian recalled his pedagogue Mardonius, a Gothic eunuch slave who reared him from the age of 7 to 15, with affection and gratitude. Usually, however, pedagogues received little respect.

Primary education in reading, writing, and arithmetic might take place at home for privileged children whose parents hired or bought a teacher. Others attended a school that was "public," though not state-supported, organized by an individual schoolmaster (ludimagister) who accepted fees from multiple parents. Vernae (homeborn slave children) might share in-home or public schooling. Schools became more numerous during the Empire and increased the opportunities for children to acquire an education. School could be held regularly in a rented space, or in any available public niche, even outdoors. Boys and girls received primary education generally from ages 7 to 12, but classes were not segregated by grade or age. For the socially ambitious, bilingual education in Greek as well as Latin was a must.

Quintilian provides the most extensive theory of primary education in Latin literature. According to Quintilian, each child has in-born ingenium, a talent for learning or linguistic intelligence that is ready to be cultivated and sharpened, as evidenced by the young child's ability to memorize and imitate. The child incapable of learning was rare. To Quintilian, ingenium represented a potential best realized in the social setting of school, and he argued against homeschooling. He also recognized the importance of play in child development, and disapproved of corporal punishment because it discouraged love of learning—in contrast to the practice in most Roman primary schools of routinely striking children with a cane (ferula) or birch rod for being slow or disruptive.

Secondary education

At the age of 14, upperclass males made their rite of passage into adulthood, and began to learn leadership roles in political, religious, and military life through mentoring from a senior member of their family or a family friend. Higher education was provided by grammatici or rhetores. The grammaticus or "grammarian" taught mainly Greek and Latin literature, with history, geography, philosophy or mathematics treated as explications of the text. With the rise of Augustus, contemporary Latin authors such as Virgil and Livy also became part of the curriculum. The rhetor was a teacher of oratory or public speaking. The art of speaking (ars dicendi) was highly prized as a marker of social and intellectual superiority, and eloquentia ("speaking ability, eloquence") was considered the "glue" of a civilized society. Rhetoric was not so much a body of knowledge (though it required a command of references to the literary canon) as it was a mode of expression and decorum that distinguished those who held social power. The ancient model of rhetorical training—"restraint, coolness under pressure, modesty, and good humour"—endured into the 18th century as a Western educational ideal.

In Latin, illiteratus (Greek agrammatos) could mean both "unable to read and write" and "lacking in cultural awareness or sophistication." Higher education promoted career advancement, particularly for an equestrian in Imperial service: "eloquence and learning were considered marks of a well-bred man and worthy of reward". The poet Horace, for instance, was given a top-notch education by his father, a prosperous former slave.

Urban elites throughout the Empire shared a literary culture embued with Greek educational ideals (paideia). Hellenistic cities sponsored schools of higher learning as an expression of cultural achievement. Young men from Rome who wished to pursue the highest levels of education often went abroad to study rhetoric and philosophy, mostly to one of several Greek schools in Athens. The curriculum in the East was more likely to include music and physical training along with literacy and numeracy. On the Hellenistic model, Vespasian endowed chairs of grammar, Latin and Greek rhetoric, and philosophy at Rome, and gave teachers special exemptions from taxes and legal penalties, though primary schoolmasters did not receive these benefits. Quintilian held the first chair of grammar. In the Eastern Empire, Berytus (present-day Beirut) was unusual in offering a Latin education, and became famous for its school of Roman law. The cultural movement known as the Second Sophistic (1st–3rd century AD) promoted the assimilation of Greek and Roman social, educational, and esthetic values, and the Greek proclivities for which Nero had been criticized were regarded from the time of Hadrian onward as integral to Imperial culture.

Educated women

Literate women ranged from cultured aristocrats to girls trained to be calligraphers and scribes. The "girlfriends" addressed in Augustan love poetry, although fictional, represent an ideal that a desirable woman should be educated, well-versed in the arts, and independent to a frustrating degree. Education seems to have been standard for daughters of the senatorial and equestrian orders during the Empire. A highly educated wife was an asset for the socially ambitious household, but one that Martial regards as an unnecessary luxury.

The woman who achieved the greatest prominence in the ancient world for her learning was Hypatia of Alexandria, who educated young men in mathematics, philosophy, and astronomy, and advised the Roman prefect of Egypt on politics. Her influence put her into conflict with the bishop of Alexandria, Cyril, who may have been implicated in her violent death in 415 at the hands of a Christian mob.

Shape of literacy
Literacy began to decline, perhaps dramatically, during the socio-political Crisis of the Third Century. After the Christianization of the Roman Empire the Christians and Church Fathers adopted and used Latin and Greek pagan literature, philosophy and natural science with a vengeance to biblical
interpretation.

Edward Grant writes that:

Julian, the only emperor after the conversion of Constantine to reject Christianity, banned Christians from teaching the classical curriculum, on the grounds that they might corrupt the minds of youth.

While the book roll had emphasized the continuity of the text, the codex format encouraged a "piecemeal" approach to reading by means of citation, fragmented interpretation, and the extraction of maxims.

In the 5th and 6th centuries, due to the gradual decline and fall of the Western Roman Empire, reading became rarer even for those within the Church hierarchy. However, in the Eastern Roman Empire, also known as Byzantine Empire, reading continued throughout the Middle Ages as reading was of primary importance as an instrument of the Byzantine civilization.

Literature 

In the traditional literary canon, literature under Augustus, along with that of the late Republic, has been viewed as the "Golden Age" of Latin literature, embodying the classical ideals of "unity of the whole, the proportion of the parts, and the careful articulation of an apparently seamless composition." The three most influential Classical Latin poets—Virgil, Horace, and Ovid—belong to this period. Virgil wrote the Aeneid, creating a national epic for Rome in the manner of the Homeric epics of Greece. Horace perfected the use of Greek lyric metres in Latin verse. Ovid's erotic poetry was enormously popular, but ran afoul of the Augustan moral programme; it was one of the ostensible causes for which the emperor exiled him to Tomis (present-day Constanța, Romania), where he remained to the end of his life. Ovid's Metamorphoses was a continuous poem of fifteen books weaving together Greco-Roman mythology from the creation of the universe to the deification of Julius Caesar. Ovid's versions of Greek myths became one of the primary sources of later classical mythology, and his work was so influential in the Middle Ages that the 12th and 13th centuries have been called the "Age of Ovid."

The principal Latin prose author of the Augustan age is the historian Livy, whose account of Rome's founding and early history became the most familiar version in modern-era literature. Vitruvius's book De architectura, the only complete work on architecture to survive from antiquity, also belongs to this period.

Latin writers were immersed in the Greek literary tradition, and adapted its forms and much of its content, but Romans regarded satire as a genre in which they surpassed the Greeks. Horace wrote verse satires before fashioning himself as an Augustan court poet, and the early Principate also produced the satirists Persius and Juvenal. The Satires of Juvenal offers a lively curmudgeon's perspective on urban society.

The period from the mid-1st century through the mid-2nd century has conventionally been called the "Silver Age" of Latin literature. Under Nero, disillusioned writers reacted to Augustanism. The three leading writers—Seneca the philosopher, dramatist, and tutor of Nero; Lucan, his nephew, who turned Caesar's civil war into an epic poem; and the novelist Petronius (Satyricon)—all committed suicide after incurring the emperor's displeasure. Seneca and Lucan were from Hispania, as was the later epigrammatist and keen social observer Martial, who expressed his pride in his Celtiberian heritage. Martial and the epic poet Statius, whose poetry collection Silvae had a far-reaching influence on Renaissance literature, wrote during the reign of Domitian.

The so-called "Silver Age" produced several distinguished writers, including the encyclopaedist Pliny the Elder; his nephew, known as Pliny the Younger; and the historian Tacitus. The Natural History of the elder Pliny, who died during disaster relief efforts in the wake of the eruption of Mount Vesuvius in 79 AD, is a vast collection on flora and fauna, gems and minerals, climate, medicine, freaks of nature, works of art, and antiquarian lore. Tacitus's reputation as a literary artist matches or exceeds his value as a historian; his stylistic experimentation produced "one of the most powerful of Latin prose styles." The Twelve Caesars by his contemporary Suetonius is one of the primary sources for imperial biography.

Among Imperial historians who wrote in Greek are Dionysius of Halicarnassus, the Jewish historian Josephus, and the senator Cassius Dio. Other major Greek authors of the Empire include the biographer and antiquarian Plutarch, the geographer Strabo, and the rhetorician and satirist Lucian. Popular Greek romance novels were part of the development of long-form fiction works, represented in Latin by the Satyricon of Petronius and The Golden Ass of Apuleius.

From the 2nd to the 4th centuries, the Christian authors who would become the Latin Church Fathers were in active dialogue with the classical tradition, within which they had been educated. Tertullian, a convert to Christianity from Roman Africa, was the contemporary of Apuleius and one of the earliest prose authors to establish a distinctly Christian voice. After the conversion of Constantine, Latin literature is dominated by the Christian perspective. When the orator Symmachus argued for the preservation of Rome's religious traditions, he was effectively opposed by Ambrose, the bishop of Milan and future saint—a debate preserved by their missives.

In the late 4th century, Jerome produced the Latin translation of the Bible that became authoritative as the Vulgate. Augustine, another of the Church Fathers from the province of Africa, has been called "one of the most influential writers of western culture", and his Confessions is sometimes considered the first autobiography of Western literature. In The City of God against the Pagans, Augustine builds a vision of an eternal, spiritual Rome, a new imperium sine fine that will outlast the collapsing Empire.

In contrast to the unity of Classical Latin, the literary esthetic of late antiquity has a tessellated quality that has been compared to the mosaics characteristic of the period. A continuing interest in the religious traditions of Rome prior to Christian dominion is found into the 5th century, with the Saturnalia of Macrobius and The Marriage of Philology and Mercury of Martianus Capella. Prominent Latin poets of late antiquity include Ausonius, Prudentius, Claudian, and Sidonius Apollinaris. Ausonius, the Bordelaise tutor of the emperor Gratian, was at least nominally a Christian, though, throughout his occasionally obscene mixed-genre poems, he retains a literary interest in the Greco-Roman gods and even druidism. The imperial panegyrist Claudian was a vir illustris who appears never to have converted. Prudentius, born in Hispania Tarraconensis and a fervent Christian, was thoroughly versed in the poets of the Classical tradition, and transforms their vision of poetry as a monument of immortality into an expression of the poet's quest for eternal life culminating in Christian salvation. Sidonius, a native of Lugdunum, was a Roman senator and bishop of Clermont who cultivated a traditional villa lifestyle as he watched the Western empire succumb to barbarian incursions. His poetry and collected letters offer a unique view of life in late Roman Gaul from the perspective of a man who "survived the end of his world".

Religion

Religion in the Roman Empire encompassed the practices and beliefs the Romans regarded as their own, as well as the many cults imported to Rome or practiced by peoples throughout the provinces. The Romans thought of themselves as highly religious, and attributed their success as a world power to their collective piety (pietas) in maintaining good relations with the gods (pax deorum). The archaic religion believed to have been handed down from the earliest kings of Rome was the foundation of the mos maiorum, "the way of the ancestors" or "tradition", viewed as central to Roman identity. There was no principle analogous to "separation of church and state". The priesthoods of the state religion were filled from the same social pool of men who held public office, and in the Imperial era, the Pontifex Maximus was the emperor.

Roman religion was practical and contractual, based on the principle of do ut des, "I give that you might give." Religion depended on knowledge and the correct practice of prayer, ritual, and sacrifice, not on faith or dogma, although Latin literature preserves learned speculation on the nature of the divine and its relation to human affairs. For ordinary Romans, religion was a part of daily life. Each home had a household shrine at which prayers and libations to the family's domestic deities were offered. Neighbourhood shrines and sacred places such as springs and groves dotted the city. Apuleius (2nd century) described the everyday quality of religion in observing how people who passed a cult place might make a vow or a fruit offering, or merely sit for a while. The Roman calendar was structured around religious observances. In the Imperial era, as many as 135 days of the year were devoted to religious festivals and games (ludi). Women, slaves, and children all participated in a range of religious activities.

In the wake of the Republic's collapse, state religion had adapted to support the new regime of the emperors. As the first Roman emperor, Augustus justified the novelty of one-man rule with a vast programme of religious revivalism and reform. Public vows formerly made for the security of the republic now were directed at the wellbeing of the emperor. So-called "emperor worship" expanded on a grand scale the traditional Roman veneration of the ancestral dead and of the Genius, the divine tutelary of every individual. Upon death, an emperor could be made a state divinity (divus) by vote of the Senate. Imperial cult, influenced by Hellenistic ruler cult, became one of the major ways Rome advertised its presence in the provinces and cultivated shared cultural identity and loyalty throughout the Empire. Cultural precedent in the Eastern provinces facilitated a rapid dissemination of Imperial cult, extending as far as the Augustan military settlement at Najran, in present-day Saudi Arabia. Rejection of the state religion became tantamount to treason against the emperor. This was the context for Rome's conflict with Christianity, which Romans variously regarded as a form of atheism and novel superstitio.

The Romans are known for the great number of deities they honoured, a capacity that earned the mockery of early Christian polemicists. As the Romans extended their dominance throughout the Mediterranean world, their policy, in general, was to absorb the deities and cults of other peoples rather than try to eradicate them. One way that Rome promoted stability among diverse peoples was by supporting their religious heritage, building temples to local deities that framed their theology within the hierarchy of Roman religion. Inscriptions throughout the Empire record the side-by-side worship of local and Roman deities, including dedications made by Romans to local gods. By the height of the Empire, numerous cults of pseudo-foreign gods (Roman reinventions of foreign gods) were cultivated at Rome and in the provinces, among them cults of Cybele, Isis, Epona, and of solar gods such as Mithras and Sol Invictus, found as far north as Roman Britain. Because Romans had never been obligated to cultivate one god or one cult only, religious tolerance was not an issue in the sense that it is for competing monotheistic systems.

Mystery religions, which offered initiates salvation in the afterlife, were a matter of personal choice for an individual, practiced in addition to carrying on one's family rites and participating in public religion. The mysteries, however, involved exclusive oaths and secrecy, conditions that conservative Romans viewed with suspicion as characteristic of "magic", conspiracy (coniuratio), and subversive activity. Sporadic and sometimes brutal attempts were made to suppress religionists who seemed to threaten traditional morality and unity. In Gaul, the power of the druids was checked, first by forbidding Roman citizens to belong to the order, and then by banning druidism altogether. At the same time, however, Celtic traditions were reinterpreted (interpretatio romana) within the context of Imperial theology, and a new Gallo-Roman religion coalesced, with its capital at the Sanctuary of the Three Gauls in Lugdunum (present-day Lyon, France). The sanctuary established precedent for Western cult as a form of Roman-provincial identity.

The monotheistic rigour of Judaism posed difficulties for Roman policy that led at times to compromise and the granting of special exemptions. Tertullian noted that the Jewish religion, unlike that of the Christians, was considered a religio licita, "legitimate religion." Wars between the Romans and the Jews occurred when conflict, political as well as religious, became intractable. When Caligula wanted to place a golden statue of his deified self in the Temple in Jerusalem, the potential sacrilege and likely war were prevented only by his timely death. The siege of Jerusalem in 70 AD led to the sacking of the temple and the dispersal of Jewish political power (see Jewish diaspora).

Christianity emerged in Roman Judea as a Jewish religious sect in the 1st century AD. The religion gradually spread out of Jerusalem, initially establishing major bases in first Antioch, then Alexandria, and over time throughout the Empire as well as beyond. Imperially authorized persecutions were limited and sporadic, with martyrdoms occurring most often under the authority of local officials.

The first persecution by an emperor occurred under Nero, and was confined to the city of Rome. Tacitus reports that after the Great Fire of Rome in AD 64, some among the population held Nero responsible and that the emperor attempted to deflect blame onto the Christians. After Nero, a major persecution occurred under the emperor Domitian and a persecution in 177 took place at Lugdunum, the Gallo-Roman religious capital. A surviving letter from Pliny the Younger, governor of Bithynia, to the emperor Trajan describes his persecution and executions of Christians. The Decian persecution of 246–251 was a serious threat to the Church, but ultimately strengthened Christian defiance. Diocletian undertook what was to be the most severe persecution of Christians, lasting from 303 to 311.

In the early 4th century, Constantine I became the first emperor to convert to Christianity. He supported the church financially and made laws that favored it, but the new religion had established itself as successful prior to Constantine. Critical mass had been reached in the hundred years between 150 and 250 when Christianity moved from less than 50,000 to over a million adherents. Growth in absolute numbers occurred in the third and the fourth centuries. Constantine and his successors banned public sacrifice while tolerating other pagan practices. Constantine never engaged in a purge, there were no pagan martyrs during his reign, and pagans remained in important positions at his court. The emperor Julian attempted to revive traditional public sacrifice and Hellenistic religion, but failed to garner support from the people. His reforms were met by Christian resistance and civic inertia.

From the 2nd century onward, the Church Fathers had begun to condemn the diverse religions practiced throughout the Empire collectively as "pagan." Christians of the fourth century believed the conversion of Constantine showed that Christianity had triumphed over paganism (in Heaven) and little further action besides such rhetoric was necessary: everything was done but the sweeping up in the Christian view. As a result, the fourth century included a focus on heresy as a higher priority than paganism. According to Peter Brown, "In most areas, polytheists were not molested, and apart from a few ugly incidents of local violence, Jewish communities also enjoyed a century of stable, even privileged, existence". There were anti-pagan laws, but they were not generally enforced. Thus, up through the sixth century, there still existed centers of paganism in Athens, Gaza, Alexandria, and elsewhere.

According to recent Jewish scholarship, the approach of toleration that the 'permitted religious' status of the Jews implied was maintained under Christian emperors. This did not extend to heretics. By the time of Theodosius I, there was still no requirement for pagans or Jews to convert to Christianity, but as a devout Nicene Christian, Theodosius made multiple laws and acted against all alternate forms of Christianity. Christian heretics were subject to persecution, coercion and death by both the Roman government and the church throughout Late Antiquity, however, non-Christians were not subject to exclusion from public life or persecution until the sixth century reigns of Justin and Justinian I. Rome's original religious hierarchy and many aspects of its ritual influenced Christian forms, and many pre-Christian beliefs and practices survived in Christian festivals and local traditions.

Legacy

Several states claimed to be the Roman Empire's successors after the fall of the Western Roman Empire. The Holy Roman Empire, an attempt to resurrect the Empire in the West, was established in 800 when Pope Leo III crowned Frankish King Charlemagne as Roman emperor on Christmas Day, though the empire and the imperial office did not become formalized for some decades. It maintained its title until its dissolution in 1806, with much of the Empire reorganized into the Confederation of the Rhine by Napoleon Bonaparte: crowned as Emperor of the French by Pope Pius VII. Still, his house would also lose this title after Napoleon abdicating and renouncing not only his own rights to the French throne and all of his titles, but also those of his descendants on 6 April 1814.

After the fall of Constantinople, the Russian Tsardom, as inheritor of the Byzantine Empire's Orthodox Christian tradition, counted itself the Third Rome (Constantinople having been the second). These concepts are known as translatio imperii. After the succession of the Russian Tsardom by the Russian Empire, ruled by the House of Romanov, this ended in the Russian Revolution of 1917 when Bolshevik revolutionaries toppled the monarchy.

After the sale of the Imperial Title by the last Eastern Roman titular, Andreas Palailogos, to Ferdinand II of Aragon and Isabella I of Castile, and the Dynastic Union between these two that proclaimed the Kingdom of Spain, it became a direct successor to the Roman Empire until today, after three restorations of the Spanish Crown.

When the Ottomans, who based their state on the Byzantine model, took Constantinople in 1453, Mehmed II established his capital there and claimed to sit on the throne of the Roman Empire. He even launched an invasion of Otranto, located in Southern Italy, with the purpose of re-uniting the Empire, which was aborted by his death. Mehmed II also invited European artists to his capital, including Gentile Bellini.

In the medieval West, "Roman" came to mean the church and the Pope of Rome. The Greek form Romaioi remained attached to the Greek-speaking Christian population of the Eastern Roman Empire and is still used by Greeks in addition to their common appellation.

The Roman Empire's territorial legacy of controlling the Italian peninsula would influence Italian nationalism and the unification of Italy (Risorgimento) in 1861. Further Roman imperialism was claimed by fascist ideology, particularly by the Italian Empire and Nazi Germany.

In the United States, the founders were educated in the classical tradition, and used classical models for landmarks and buildings in Washington, D.C., to avoid the feudal and religious connotations of European architecture such as castles and cathedrals. In forming their theory of the mixed constitution, the founders looked to Athenian democracy and Roman republicanism for models, but regarded the Roman emperor as a figure of tyranny.

See also 

 Outline of ancient Rome
 Fall of the Western Roman Empire
 List of political systems in France
 List of Roman dynasties
 Daqin ("Great Qin"), the ancient Chinese name for the Roman Empire; see also Sino-Roman relations
 Imperial Italy
Byzantine Empire under the Justinian dynasty

Notes

References

Citations

Sources

External links

 BBC: What the Romans Did for Us
 Roman Archaeological Sites
 Historical Atlas showing the expansion of the Roman Empire.
 Roman-Empire.net, learning resources and re-enactments
 The Historical Theater in the Year 400 AD, in Which Both Romans and Barbarians Resided Side by Side in the Eastern Part of the Roman Empire

 
Ancient Italian history
Italian states
Former countries in Europe
Former countries in Africa
Former countries in Western Asia
Countries in ancient Africa

27 BC establishments
1st-century BC establishments in Italy
States and territories established in the 1st century BC
States and territories disestablished in the 5th century
States and territories disestablished in 1453
476 disestablishments
470s disestablishments
5th-century disestablishments in Italy
History of the Mediterranean
Former empires in Europe
Western culture
Historical transcontinental empires